This is a list of notable women writers.

See also women writers by nationality

Abbreviations: b. (born), c. (circa), ch. (children's), col. (columnist), es. (essayist), fl. (flourished), Hc. (Holocaust), mem. (memoirist), non-f. (non-fiction), nv. (novelist), pw. (playwright), wr. (writer), TV (television), YA (young adults')

M

Ma–Mc
Rozena Maart (b. 1962, South Africa), poet & fiction wr. in English
Sharon Maas (b. 1951, Guyana/England), nv.
Catherine Maberly (1805–1875, Ireland/England), fiction & non-f. wr.
Lindiwe Mabuza (1938–2021, South Africa), poet & academic
Aifric Mac Aodha (b. 1979, Ireland), poet
Dorothy Macardle (1889–1958, Ireland), nv., pw. & historian
Bridget G. MacCarthy (1904–1993, Ireland), wr. & academic
Ethna MacCarthy (1903–1959, Ireland), poet & pediatrician
Mary Stanislaus MacCarthy (1849–1897, Ireland), poet, educator & nun
Rose Macaulay (1881–1958, England), wr.
Maria Antonietta Macciocchi (1922–2007, Italy), wr. & politician
Doireann MacDermott (b. 1923, Ireland), wr. & philologist
Ann-Marie MacDonald (b. 1958, Canada/Newfoundland), nv., pw. & actor
Betty MacDonald (1908–1958, United States), wr.
Charlotte Macdonald (living, New Zealand), historian
Elizabeth Roberts MacDonald (1864–1922, Canada) poet, ch. wr., ss. wr. & non-f. wr.
Helen Macdonald (b. 1970, England), wr., naturalist & academic
Lilou Macé (b. 1977, France/United States), wr.
Mirta Macedo (1939–2012, Uruguay), social wr.
Gwendolyn MacEwen (1941–1987, Canada/Newfoundland), nv. & poet
Rebecca Macfie (living, New Zealand), non-f. wr. & col.
Marjorie Oludhe Macgoye (1928–2015, England/Kenya), poet & nv.
Ana Maria Machado (b. 1941, Brazil), ch. wr.
Gilka Machado (1893–1980, Brazil), poet & activist
Maria Clara Machado (1921–2001, Brazil), pw. & ch. wr.
Dorothea Macheiner (b. 1943, Austria/Austria-Hungary), nv., poet & pw.
Elisabeth MacIntyre (1916–2004, Australia), ch. wr.
Louise Mack (1870–1935, Australia), poet & nv.
Catherine Julia Mackay (1864–1944, New Zealand), cookery wr.
Jessie Mackay (1864–1938, New Zealand), poet & animal rights activist
Shena Mackay (b. 1944, Scotland), nv.
Dorothea Mackellar (1885–1968, Australia), poet & fiction wr.
Anna Mackenzie (b. 1963, New Zealand), fiction & YA wr.
Serena Mackesy (b. 1960s, England), nv.
Mary Mackey (b. 1945, United States), nv., poet & academic
Mary Mackie (b. early 1940s, England), fiction & non-f. wr.
Marisa Mackle (b. c. 1973, Ireland), nv. & ch. wr.
Patricia MacLachlan (1938–2022, United States), ch. nv.
Mary MacLane (1881–1929, Canada/Newfoundland/United States), wr.
Hester Maclean (1859–1932, Australia/New Zealand), nursing wr. & autobiographer
Charlotte MacLeod (1922–2005, Canada/Newfoundland/United States), nv. & mystery wr.
Della Campbell MacLeod (ca. 1884 – ?, United States), fiction & non-f. wr.
Eleanor MacMahon (1864–1956, Ireland/England), nv.
Kathleen MacMahon (living, Ireland), wr. & broadcaster
Sarah Broom Macnaughtan (1864–1916, Scotland), nv.
Máire MacNeill (1904–1987, Ireland), folklorist
Debbie Macomber (b. 1948, United States), nv.
Katharine Sarah Macquoid (1824–1917, England), nv. & travel wr.
Rina Macrelli (1929–2020, Italy), screenwriter & es.
Catherine Mary MacSorley (1848–1929, Ireland), YA & religious wr.
Marie MacSweeney (living, Ireland), poet & fiction wr.
Okky Madasari (b. 1984, Indonesia), nv., es. & ch. wr.
Deirdre Madden (b. 1960, Ireland), nv.
Heidrun E. Mader (b. 1977, Germany), non-fiction
Ruth Mader (b. 1974, Austria/Austria-Hungary), screenwriter
Naomi Long Madgett (1923–2020, United States), poet
Malika Madi (b. 1967, Belgium), nv. in French
Maga Magazinović (1882–1968, Serbia), wr.
Perihan Mağden (b. 1960, Turkey/Ottoman Empire), nv.
Audrey Magee (living, Ireland), nv.
Melba Padilla Maggay (b. 1950, Philippines), wr. & social anthropologist
Kellie Magnus (b. 1970, Jamaica), ch. & parenting wr.
Guðrún Kristín Magnúsdóttir (b. 1939, Iceland), ch. & nature wr.
Þórunn Elfa Magnúsdóttir (1910–1995, Iceland), nv.
Sindiwe Magona (b. 1943, South Africa), fiction wr. & autobiographer in English
Nilah Magruder (living, United States), wr.
Akka Mahadevi (c. 1130–1160, India), poet
Sabrina Mahfouz (living, England), poet & pw
Han Mahlsook (한말숙, b. 1931, Korea), nv.
Bríd Mahon (1922–2008, Ireland), nv. & folklorist
Florence Mahoney (b. 1929, Gambia), wr. & historian
Mahsati Ganjavi (c. 1089 – post-1159, Iran/Persia), poet
Margaret Mahy (1936–2012, New Zealand), ch. & YA wr.
Circe Maia (b. 1939, Uruguay), poet & es.
Jennifer Maiden (b. 1949, Australia), poet
Ruth Maier (1920–1942, Austria/Austria-Hungary), diarist & Hc. victim
Chantal Maillard (b. 1951, Spain), poet & philosopher
Ella Maillart (1903–1997, Switzerland), travel wr. in French
Antonine Maillet (b. 1929, Canada/Newfoundland), nv., pw. & scholar
Barbara York Main (1929–2019, Australia), arachnologist
Marie Majerová (1882–1967, Austria/Austria-Hungary/Czechoslovakia/Czech Republic), fiction wr.
Marianne Majerus (b. 1956, Luxembourg), garden wr.
Clementina Laura Majocchi (1866–1945, Italy), poet & wr.
Maria Majocchi (1864–1917, Italy), wr. & poet
Megha Majumdar (b. 1987/1988, India), nv.
Tilottama Majumdar (b. 1966, India), fiction wr., poet & es.
Svetlana Makarovič (b. 1939, Yugoslavia/Slovenia), poet & YA wr.
Jean Said Makdisi (b. 1940, Palestine), non-f. wr.
Barbara Makhalisa (b. 1949, Zimbabwe), nv. & editor
Anju Makhija (living, India/Canada/Newfoundland), poet, pw. & col.
Angela Makholwa (living, South Africa), fiction wr.
Miyako Maki (牧美也子, b. 1935, Japan), manga creator
Eudokia Makrembolitissa (c. 1021–1096, Byzantium), poet in Greek & empress
Desanka Maksimović (1898–1993, Serbia), poet
Rima Maktabi (b. 1977, Lebanon), col. Ad
Jennifer Nansubuga Makumbi (b. 1960s, Uganda), fiction wr.
Ana María Llona Málaga (b. 1936, Peru), poet
Ezza Agha Malak (b. 1942, Lebanon/France), nv., poet & critic
Natalia Malakhovskaia (b. 1948, Soviet Union/Austria/Austria-Hungary), feminist wr.
Battista Malatesta (c. 1384–1448, Italy), poet
Geneviève-Françoise Randon de Malboissière (1746–1766, France), poet, pw. & naturalist
Emilie Monson Malcolm (c. 1830–1905, England/New Zealand), domestic wr.
Wanda Malecka (1800–1860, Poland), poet & nv.
Rosie Malek-Yonan (b. 1965, Assyria), nv. & actor
Oriel Malet (Lady Auriel Rosemary Malet Vaughan, 1923–2014, England), nv. & biographer
Amita Malik (1921–2009, India), critic
Nicole Malinconi (b. 1946, Belgium), fiction wr. in French
Gitta Mallasz (1907–1992, Hungary), wr. of dialogues
Ana Caro de Mallén (1590–1646, Spain), poet & pw.
Nathalie Mallet (living, Canada/Newfoundland), science fiction & fantasy wr.
Françoise Mallet-Joris (1930–2016, Belgium), nv. & es. in French
Heather Mallick (b. 1959, Canada/Newfoundland), col., wr. & lecturer
Clare Mallory (1913–1991, New Zealand), ch. wr.
Bodil Malmsten (1944–2016, Sweden), poet & nv.
Amina Mama (b. 1958, Scotland/Nigeria), social wr.
Tatiana Mamonova (b. 1943, Soviet Union/Russia), poet & politician
Angela Manalang-Gloria (1907–1995, Philippines), poet in English
Becky Manawatu (b. 1982, New Zealand), nv. & col.
Laura Beatrice Mancini (1821–1969, Italy), poet
Emily St. John Mandel (b. 1979, Canada/Newfoundland), nv.
Zindzi Mandela (1960–2020, South Africa), poet
Nadezhda Mandelstam (1899–1980, Russia/Soviet Union), mem.
Jane Mander (1887–1949, New Zealand/England), nv. & col.
Slavka Maneva (1934–2010, Yugoslavia/North Macedonia), ch. wr. & poet
Edda Manga (b. 1969, Sweden), historian of ideas
Richmal Mangnall (1769–1820, England), schoolbook wr.
Anne Marie Mangor (1781–1865, Denmark), cookery wr.
Rani Manicka (living, Malaysia/England), nv.
Salmi Manja (b. 1937, Malaysia), fiction wr.
Irshad Manji (b. 1968, Uganda/United States), religious wr.
Delarivier Manley (c. 1670–1724, England), nv., pw. & pamphleteer
Edna Manley (1900–1987, England/Jamaica), sculptor & diarist
Rachel Manley (b. 1955, Jamaica/Canada/Newfoundland), poet & fiction wr.
Alana Mann (fl. 2000s, Australia), wr. on food
Erika Mann (1905–1969, Germany), wr., screenwriter & actor
María Emma Mannarelli (b. 1954, Peru), non-f. wr., historian, professor
Eeva-Liisa Manner (1921–1995, Finland), poet & pw.
Catherine Gray, Lady Manners (1766–1852, Ireland/England), poet
Emily Manning (Australie, 1845–1890, Australia), poet & col.
Mary Manning (1905–1999, Ireland/United States), nv., pw. & critic
Olivia Manning (1908–1980, England), nv.
Ruth Manning-Sanders (1886–1988, Wales/England), poet, wr. & ch. wr.
Kiran Manral (b. 1971, India), nv. & parenting wr.
Chris Mansell (b. 1953, Australia), poet
Katherine Mansfield (1888–1923, New Zealand/England), fiction wr.
Eduarda Mansilla (1834–1892, Argentina), nv., pw. & critic
Fadhma Aït Mansour, (c. 1882–1967, Algeria), poet & singer
Latifa Ben Mansour (b. 1950, Algeria/France), nv., linguist & psychoanalyst
Alicia Catherine Mant (1788–1869, England/Ireland), ch. wr.
Lisa Mantchev (living, United States), fantasy nv.
Hilary Mantel (1952—2022, England), fiction wr., mem. & es.; Wolf Hall
Réka Mán-Várhegyi (b. 1979, Russia/Hungary), fiction & ch. wr.
Sarah Ladipo Manyika (b. 1968, Nigeria/England), fiction wr. & es.
Gianna Manzini (1896–1974, Italy), fiction wr.
Mokbula Manzoor (1938–2020, India/Bangladesh), nv. & wr.
Lee Maracle (1950–2021, Canada/Newfoundland), poet, nv. & storyteller
Carmen Marai (Carmen María Bassa Rodríguez, living, Chile), poet & nv.
Dacia Maraini (b. 1936, Italy), nv., pw. & poet
Faustina Maratti (c. 1679–1745, Italy), poet & painter
Maria Mercè Marçal (1952–1998, Spain), poet & wr. in Catalan
Jane Marcet (1769–1858, England), salonnière & popular science wr.
Melina Marchetta (b. 1965, Australia), nv.
Andrea Marcolongo (b. 1987, Italy), es. & wr.
Emilie Maresse-Paul (1838–1900, Trinidad), feminist
Inés Marful (b. 1961, Spain), nv. & literature wr.
Anna Margolin (1887–1952, Russia/United States), Yiddish poet
Silvana De Mari (b. 1953, Italy), nv.
Juliet Marillier (b. 1948, New Zealand/Australia), nv. & YA writer
Guadalupe Marín (1895–1983, Mexico), nv. & model
Katarina Marinčič (b. 1968, Slovenia), fiction wr. & literary historian
Lucrezia Marinella (1571–1653, Italy), poet & wr.
Alexandra Marinina (b. 1957, Soviet Union/Russia), fiction wr.
María Mariño (1907–1967, Spain), wr.
Kamala Markandaya (1924–2004, India), nv.
Beryl Markham (1902–1986, England/Kenya), aviator & wr.
Liza Marklund (b. 1962, Sweden), nv.
Maria Markova (b. 1982, Soviet Union/Russia), poet
Daphne Marlatt (b. 1942, Canada/Newfoundland), poet
Olga Marlin (b. 1934, United States/Kenya), autobiographer
E. Marlitt (1825–1887, Germany), nv.
Nilgün Marmara (1958–1987, Turkey/Ottoman Empire), poet
Jeanne Marni (1854–1910, France), nv. & pw.
Monika Maron (b. 1941, Germany), es. & political wr.
Leïla Marouane (b. 1960, Algeria/France), nv.
Ana Marija Marović (1815–1887, Serbia), poet & painter
Susan Lowndes Marques (1907–1993, England/Portugal), travel wr.
Anne de Marquets (b. c. 1533–1588, France), poet & nun
Manuela Antonia Márquez García-Saavedra (1844–1890, Peru), wr., poet
Paula Contreras Márquez (1911–2008, Spain), nv. & wr.
Paz Márquez-Benítez (1894–1983, Philippines), fiction wr. & editor
Ellen Marriage (1865–1946, England), translator
Janice Marriott (b. 1946, England/New Zealand), ch. & YA wr., poet & gardener
Ngaio Marsh (1895–1982, New Zealand), mystery wr.
Selina Tusitala Marsh (b. 1971, New Zealand), poet & academic
Paule Marshall (1929–2019, United States), nv.
Una Marson (1905–1965, Jamaica), radio producer & poet
Patricia De Martelaere (1957–2009, Belgium), philosopher & es. in Flemish
Esperanza Brito de Martí (1932–2007, Mexico), col.
Harriet Evans Martin (died 1846, Ireland), nv.
Harriet Letitia Martin (1801–1891, England/Ireland), nv.
Mary Letitia Martin (1815–1850, Ireland/Belgium), nv.
Ros Martin (living, England), pw., poet & activist
Violet Florence Martin (1862–1915, Ireland), co-wr. of fiction
Agnès Martin-Lugand (b. 1979, France), nv.
Catherine Edith Macauley Martin (1847–1937, Australia), nv.
Faith Martin (living, England), thriller wr.
Harriet Martineau (1802–1876, England), nv. & theorist
Nela Martínez (1912–2004, Ecuador), political wr. & activist
Sanjuana Martínez (b. 1963, Mexico), social analyst
Susana Martinez-Conde (b. 1969, Spain), science wr.
Raquel Martínez-Gómez (b. 1973, Spain/Uruguay), nv.
Tânia Martins (b. 1957, Brazil), poet
Moa Martinson (1890–1964, Sweden), nv. & es.
Kati Marton (b. 1949, Hungary/United States), political wr.
Olga Martynova (b. 1962, Soviet Union/Germany), poet, es. & nv.
Margaret Maruani (1954–2022, Tunisia/France), wr.
Cissy van Marxveldt (1889–1948, Netherlands), ch. wr.
Barbara Masekela (b. 1941, South Africa), poet & activist in English
Mohale Mashigo (b. 1983, South Africa), nv. & songwriter in English
Lebogang Mashile (b. 1979, South Africa), actor, wr. & poet
Emma Mashinini (1929–2017, South Africa), autobiographer in English & politician
Dorota Masłowska (b. 1983, Poland), nv. & pw.
Amelia Gere Mason (1831–1923 United States), es. & author
Bobbie Ann Mason (b. 1940, United States), fiction wr., es. & critic
Judi Ann Mason (1955–2009, United States), pw. & screenwriter
María Josefa Massanés (1811–1887, Spain), poet in Catalan & Spanish
Janine Massard (b. 1939, Switzerland), fiction & non-f. wr. in French
Renée Massip (1907–2002, France), nv.
Ursula Masson (1945–2008, Wales), wr. & academic
Olga Masters (1919–1986, Australia), fiction wr. & col.
Jenny Mastoraki (b. 1949, Greece), poet & translator
Ángeles Mastretta (b. 1949, Mexico), fiction wr. & mem.
Kāterina Mataira (1932–2011, New Zealand), exponent of Maori
Julijana Matanović (b. 1959, Yugoslavia/Croatia), fiction wr.
Pilar Mateos (b. 1942, Spain), ch. wr.
Beverly Matherne (b. 1946, United States), wr. & poet
Petra Mathers (b. 1945, Germany/United States), ch. wr. & illustrator
Mary Mathew (1724–1777, Ireland), diarist
Sarah Mathew (c. 1805–1890, England/New Zealand), diarist
Peta Mathias (living, New Zealand), food wr.
Nicole-Claude Mathieu (1937–2014, France), anthropologist & feminist
Manana Matiashvili (b. 1978, Georgia (Caucasus)), poet & philologist
Maria Matios (b. 1959, Ukraine), poet & nv.
Kopano Matlwa (b. 1985, South Africa), nv. in English
Sanami Matoh (真東砂波, b. 1969, Japan), manga creator
Chiara Matraini (1515–1604, Italy), poet & prose wr.
Larisa Matros (b. 1938, Soviet Union/United States), philosopher & fiction wr.
Nina Matsumoto (b. 1984, Japan/Canada/Newfoundland), cartoonist & nv.
Temari Matsumoto (松本テマリ, living, Japan), manga creator & illustrator
Akemi Matsunae (松苗あけみ, b. 1956, Japan), manga creator
Akimoto Matsuyo (秋元松代, 1911–2001, Japan), pw. & scriptwriter
Dalene Matthee (1938–2005, South Africa), nv. in English
Olga Elena Mattei (b. 1933, Puerto Rico/Comoros), poet
Tina Matthews (b. 1961, New Zealand), ch. & YA wr. & illustrator
Gill Matthewson (living, New Zealand), wr. on architecture
Christobel Mattingley (1931–2019, Australia), ch. wr.
Ellen Mattson (b. 1962, Sweden), fiction wr.
Ana María Matute (1925–2014, Spain), nv.
Genoveva Matute (1915–2009, Philippines), fiction wr. in Tagalog
Caitlín Maude (1941–1982, Ireland), poet & activist
Neža Maurer (b. 1930, Yugoslavia/Slovenia), poet & ch. & YA writer
Daphne du Maurier (1907–1989, England), fiction wr.
Zenta Mauriņa (1897–1978, Latvia), biographer & fiction wr. in Latvian & German
Novella Matveyeva (1934–2016, Soviet Union/Russia), poet, screenwriter & pw.
Vera Matveyeva (1945–1976, Soviet Union), poet & songwriter*
Sophie Dora Spicer Maude (1854–?, United Kingdom), wr. & nv.
Constantia Maxwell (1886–1962, Ireland), historian & academic
Marina Ama Omowale Maxwell (living, Trinidad), pw. & poet
Megan Maxwell (b. 1965, Spain), romance nv.
Julia Harris May (1833–1912, United States), poet
Muriel May (1897–1982, New Zealand), wr.
Patricia Mayayo (born 1967, Spain), non-f. wr.
Jane Mayhall (1918–2009, United States), poet
Antonia Maymón (1881–1959, Spain), anarchist wr. & nv.
Olga Maynard (1913–1994, Brazil/United States), non-f. wr.
Cath Mayo (living, New Zealand), fiction, ch. & YA wr. & musician
DeBarra Mayo (b. 1953, United States), fitness wr.
Eleanor Mayo (1920–1981, United States), nv.
Rosa Mayreder (1858–1938, Austria/Austria-Hungary), feminist wr.
Friederike Mayröcker (1924–2021, Austria/Austria-Hungary), poet & pw.
Katarina Mazetti (b. 1944, Sweden), wr.
Margaret Mazzantini (b. 1961, Italy), wr. & actor
Melania Mazzucco (b. 1966, Italy), screenwriter & nv.
Penda Mbow (b. 1955, Senegal), historian & activist
Rose Mbowa (1943–1999, Uganda), pw. & academic
Imbolo Mbue (b. 1981, Cameroon), fiction wr.
Mary Rootes Thornton McAboy (1815–1892, United States), poet
Constance Jane McAdam (Constance Clyde, 1872–1951, Australia), wr. & suffragette
Rachel McAlpine (b. 1940, New Zealand), poet, pw. & nv.
Maxine McArthur (b. 1962, Australia), science fiction wr.
Joan McBreen (b. 1947, Ireland), poet
Bunny McBride (b. 1950, United States), wr. & anthropologist
Eimear McBride (b. 1976, Ireland), nv.
Kate McCabe (living, Ireland), nv.
Lida Rose McCabe (1865–1938, United States), author, journalist, lecturer
Nell McCafferty (b. 1944, Ireland), pw. & campaigner
Anne McCaffrey (1926–2011, United States), science fiction nv.
Felicity McCall (living, Ireland), nv., pw. & non-f. wr.
Mary McCallum (b. 1961, Zambia/New Zealand), fiction wr., es. & poet
Mary McCarthy (1912–1989, United States), nv., critic & mem.
Mary McCarthy (b. 1946, United States), screenwriter
Mary McCarthy  (1951–2013, Ireland), nv. and critic
Mary Eunice McCarthy (1899–1969, United States), pw. & screenwriter
Sue McCauley (b. 1941, New Zealand), fiction & screenwriter & pw.
Shirla R. McClain (1935–1997, United States), educator
Jen McClanaghan (living, United States), poet
Letitia McClintock (1835–1917, Ireland), nv. & story collector
Nellie McClung (1873–1951, Canada/Newfoundland), feminist, wr. & activist
Joanna McClure (b. 1930, United States), poet
Lyn McConchie (b. 1946, New Zealand), fiction & ch. wr. & poet
Annie Virginia McCracken (1868–?, United States), ss. wr.
Elizabeth McCracken (b. 1966, United States), nv. & editor
Georgiana Huntly McCrae (1804–1890, Australia), diarist & painter
Sharyn McCrumb (b. 1948, United States), fiction wr.
Jenny McCudden (living, Ireland), non-f. wr., poet & col.
Carson McCullers (1917–1967, United States), nv.
Colleen McCullough (1937–2015, Australia), nv.
Carolyn McCurdie (b. 1947, England/New Zealand), YA and fiction wr. & poet
Alice McDermott (b. 1953, United States), fiction wr.
Mary McDermott (fl. 1832, Ireland), poet
Mary McDonagh (b. 1849, Ireland/United States), poet
Rosaleen McDonagh (living, Ireland), pw. & activist
Jill McDonald (1927–1982, New Zealand/England), ch. wr. & illustrator
Nan McDonald (1921–1974, Australia), poet & editor
Melanie McFadyean (living, England), journalist, broadcaster & lecturer
Ella May McFadyen (1887–1976, Australia), poet & ch. wr.
Fiona McFarlane (b. 1978, Australia), nv.
Shona McFarlane (1929–2001, New Zealand), non-f. wr.
Phyllis McGinley (1905–1978, United States), ch. wr. & poet
Michelle McGrane (b. 1974, Zimbabwe), poet
Fiona McGregor (b. 1965, Australia), wr. & artist
Medbh McGuckian (b. 1950, Northern Ireland), poet
Maura McHugh (living, Ireland), fiction wr., pw. & screenwriter
Siobhán McHugh (living, Ireland/Australia), wr. & documentary maker
Lisa McInerney (b. 1981, Ireland), fiction wr.
Ami McKay (b. 1968, Canada/Newfoundland), nv. & pw.
Edith McKay (1891–1963, Australia), fiction wr.
Suzy McKee Charnas (1939–2023, United States), nv. & short story wr.
Alecia McKenzie (living, Jamaica), YA wr.
Elizabeth McKenzie (b. 1958, United States), wr. & editor
Patricia A. McKillip (1948–2022, United States), science fiction & fantasy wr.
Tamara McKinley (b. 1948, Australia), nv.
Mignon McLaughlin (1913–1983, United States), col. & wr.
Emma McLaughlin (b. 1974, United States), nv.
Rosemary McLeod (b. 1949, New Zealand), wr. on domestic skills
Pauline McLynn (b. 1962, Ireland), author & actor
Charlotte Elizabeth McManus (1850–1941, Ireland), historian & nv.
Emily Julian McManus (1865–1918, Canada), poet, author, and educator
Liz McManus (b. 1947, Ireland), nv. & politician
Rhyll McMaster (b. 1947, Australia), poet & nv.
Terry McMillan (b. 1951, United States), nv.
Linda McNabb (b. 1963, England/New Zealand), ch. & YA writer
Bertha McNamara (1853–1931, Australia), pamphleteer
Kit McNaughton (c. 1887–1953, Australia), diarist & nurse
Donna McNeil (1948, Germany/United States) wr
Janet McNeill (1907–1994, Ireland/England), nv. & pw.
Anna McPartlin (b. 1972, Ireland), nv.
Martha McPhee (b. 1965, United States), nv.
Cilla McQueen (b. 1949, England/New Zealand), poet
Dionyse McTair (b. 1950, Trinidad), poet
Dervla McTiernan (b. 1977, Ireland), crime wr.

Me–Mi
Richelle Mead (b. 1976, United States), nv.
L. T. Meade (1844–1914, Ireland), girls' writer
Teresa Meana Suárez (born 1952, Spain), feminist activist, teacher, philologist & non-f. wr.
Roisin Meaney (b. 1959, Ireland), nv.
A. Garland Mears (1842–1920, Ireland), nv.
Gillian Mears (1964–2016, Australia), fiction wr.
Meavenn (1911–1992, France), poet, nv. & pw. in Breton
Gwerful Mechain (fl. 1460–1500, Wales), poet
Mechthild of Magdeburg (c. 1207 – c. 1282–1294, Germany), mystic wr. in Low German
Marina Ripa di Meana (1941–2018, Italy), nv.
Saint Mechtilde of Hackeb. (1240/1241–1298, Germany), religious wr. in Latin
Máighréad Medbh (b. 1959, Ireland), wr. & poet
Elena Medel (b. 1985, Spain), poet
Nia Medi (living, Wales), nv. & actor
Susana Medina (b. 1966, England/Spain), wr. in Spanish & English
Paula Meehan (b. 1955, Ireland), poet & pw.
C. K. Meena (b. 1957, India), nv. & col.
Fatima Meer (1928–2010, South Africa), sociologist in English
Vonne van der Meer (b. 1952, Netherlands), fiction wr. & pw.
Meera (1498–1556, India), poet & mystic
K. R. Meera (b. 1970, India), fiction & ch. wr.
Selma Meerbaum-Eisinger (1924–1942, Romania/Germany), poet
Mariella Mehr (1947–2022, Switzerland), nv. in French
Marsha Mehran (1977–2014, Iran/Persia), nv.
Rama Mehta (1923–1978, India), nv. & sociologist
Dora van der Meiden-Coolsma (1918–2001, Netherlands), col. & ch. wr.
Doeschka Meijsing (1947–2012, Netherlands), nv.
Cecília Meireles (1901–1964, Brazil), wr. & educator
Isa Meireles (c. 1932–2008, Portugal), ch. wr.
Elena Arizmendi Mejia (1884–1949, Mexico), wr. & autobiographer
Tsehay Melaku (b. c. 1952, Ethiopia), nv. in Amharic
Tamta Melashvili (b. 1979, Georgia (Caucasus)), nv.
Ekaterine Melikishvili (1854–1928, Georgia (Caucasus)), translator & ch. wr.
Melinno (fl. 2nd century BC, Ancient Greece), poet
Anastasia Melnichenko (b. 1984, Ukraine), social wr.
Rosita Melo (1897–1981, Argentina), poet & composer
Maile Meloy (b. 1972, United States), fiction wr.
Pauline Melville (b. 1948, Guyana/England), wr. & actor
Velma Caldwell Melville (1858–1924, United States), editor & wr.
Eva Menasse (b. 1970, Austria/Austria-Hungary), nv. & col.
Rigoberta Menchú (b. 1959, Guatemala), political wr.
Jane Mendelsohn (b. 1965, United States), wr.
Charlotte Mendelson (b. 1972, England), nv. & editor
Concha Méndez (1898–1968, Spain), poet & pw.
Lucrecia Méndez (b. 1943, Guatemala), academic & critic
Mariana Cox Méndez (1871–1914, Chile), fiction wr. & es.
Armine Rhea Mendoza (living, Philippines), nv. in Tagalog
Juana Belén Gutiérrez de Mendoza (1875–1942, Mexico), activist & poet
Luisa Carvajal y Mendoza (1566–1614, Spain), religious poet
Margarita Robles de Mendoza (1896–1954, Mexico), wr. on motherhood
María Luisa Mendoza (1930–2018, Mexico), nv. & politician
Susan Mendus (b. 1951, Wales), political philosopher
Saida Menebhi (1952–1977, Morocco), poet & activist
Amparo Menendez-Carrion (b. 1949, Uruguay/Ecuador), political wr.
Maaza Mengiste (b. 1974, Ethiopia/United States), nv.
Teresa Meniru (1931–1994, Nigeria), YA & ch. wr.
Indu Menon (b. 1980, India), fiction wr., screenwriter & sociologist
A. L. Mentxaka (d. 2022, Ireland), modernist scholar
Wolla Meranda, (1863–1951, Australia), nv.
Martha Mercader (1926–2010, Argentina), fiction & ch. wr.
Antonieta Rivas Mercado (1900–1931, Mexico),
Tununa Mercado (b. 1939, Argentina), fiction wr. & es.
Sophie Mereau (1770–1806, Germany), nv. & poet
Courtney Sina Meredith (b. 1986, New Zealand), political wr. & pw.
Gwen Meredith (1907–2006, Australia), pw., scriptwriter & nv.
Louisa Meredith (1812–1895, Australia), non-f. wr., poet & nv.
Edna Merey-Apinda (b. 1976, Gabon), wr.
Kersti Merilaas (1913–1986, Estonia), poet & ch. wr.
Marguerite Merington (1875–1951, England/United States), pw. & fiction & non-f. wr.
Alda Merini (1931–2009, Italy), wr. & poet
Ana Merino (b. 1971, Spain), poet
Louise Meriwether (b. 1923, United States), nv. & es.
Fatema Mernissi (1940–2015, Morocco), sociologist
Helen Maud Merrill (1865–1943, United States), woman of letters & poet
Jenny B. Merrill (1854–1934, United States), educator, non-f. wr.
Catherine Merriman (living, Wales), fiction wr.
Nuray Mert (b. 1960, Turkey/Ottoman Empire), political scientist
Lina Meruane (b. 1970, Chile), wr. & academic
Sara Mesa (b. 1976, Spain), fiction wr. & poet
Elizabeth Messenger (1908–1965, New Zealand), cookery wr. & nv.
Maria Messina (1887–1944, Italy), social wr. & nv.
Claire Messud (b. 1966, United States), nv. & academic
Grace Metalious (1924–1964, United States), nv.
Antigone Metaxa-Krontera (1905–1971, Greece), ch. wr.
Joan Metelerkamp (b. 1956, South Africa), poet in English
Ida Mett (1901–1973, Russia/France), political wr.
Charlotte Mew (1869–1928, England), poet
Johanne Meyer (1838–1915, Denmark), suffragist & pacifist
Stephenie Meyer (b. 1973, United States), nv.
Miriam Meyerhoff (b. 1964, United States/New Zealand), sociolinguist
Alice Meynell (1847–1922, England), critic & poet
Esther Meynell (1878–1955, England), wr. & historian
Isabel Meyrelles (b. 1929, Portugal/France), poet & sculptor
Malwida von Meysenbug (1816–1903, Germany), political wr. & mem.
Samar Samir Mezghanni (b. 1988, Tunisia), ch. wr.
Malika Mezzane (born 1960), Moroccan poet and novelist
Nontsizi Mgqwetho (fl. 1920s, South Africa), poet in isiXhosa
Máire Mhac an tSaoi (1922–2021, Ireland), poet, wr. and scholar
Gcina Mhlophe (b. 1958, South Africa), storyteller in 4 languages
Mian Mian (棉棉, b. 1970, China), fiction wr.
Hanny Michaelis (1922–2007, Netherlands), poet
Karin Michaëlis (1872–1950, Denmark), fiction & ch. wr. & autobiographer
Anne Michaels (b. 1958, Canada/Newfoundland), nv. & poet
Concha Michel (1899–1990, Mexico), pw., songwriter & activist
Natacha Michel (b. 1941, France), nv. & critic
Margarita Michelena (1917–1998, Mexico), poet & critic
Sólrún Michelsen (b. 1948, Faroe Islands), fiction & ch. wr. & poet
Michitsuna's mother (藤原道綱母, 935–995, Japan), poet
Veronica Micle (1850–1889, Austria/Austria-Hungary/Romania), poet
Agnes Miegel (1879–1964, Germany), col., wr. & poet
Helene Migerka (1867–1928, Austria/Austria-Hungary), poet & prose wr.
Cécile Miguel (1921–2001, Belgium), poet, pw. & nv. in French
Annabel Miguelena (b. 1984, Panama), fiction wr.
Aksinia Mihaylova (b. 1963, Bulgaria), poet & translator
Jasmina Mihajlović (b. 1960, Serbia), wr. & critic
Jo Mihaly (1902–1989, Germany), diarist, nv. & dancer
Mitsukazu Mihara (三原ミツカズ, b. 1970, Japan), manga wr. & artist
Mira Mihelič (1912–1985, Yugoslavia/Slovenia), nv.
Ene Mihkelson (1944–2017, Estonia), poet & nv.
Sevda Mikayilova (b. 1953, Azerbaijan), poet & philologist
Kato Mikeladze (1878–1942, Georgia (Caucasus)/Soviet Union), commentator
Marja-Leena Mikkola (b. 1939, Finland), wr.
Jung Mi-kyung (정미경, 1960–2017, Korea), nv.
Karlo Mila (b. 1974, New Zealand), poet
Farzaneh Milani (b. 1947, Iran/Persia/United States), scholar & wr.
Jana Milčinski (1920–2007, Yugoslavia/Slovenia), science & ch. wr.
Grace Mildmay (1552–1620, England), diarist
Dorothy Miles (1931–1993, Wales), poet & activist for deaf
Josephine Miles (1911–1985, United States), poet & critic
Leda Mileva (1920–2013, Bulgaria), wr. & diplomat
Princess Milica of Serbia (c. 1335–1405, Serbia), poet
Ognjenka Milićević (1927–2008, Serbia), theater wr.
María del Carmen Millán (1914–1882, Mexico), literature scholar
Selena Millares (b. 1963, Spain), poet & nv.
Edna St. Vincent Millay (1892–1950, United States), poet
Betty Miller (1910–1965, Ireland), fiction & non-f. wr.
Caroline Pafford Miller (1903–1992, United States), nv.
Grażyna Miller (1957–2009, Poland/Italy), poet & translator into Italian
Isabel Miller (1924–1996, United States), nv.
Elizabeth Miller (1878–1961, United States), nv.
Jeannette Miller (1944, Dominican Republic), poetry, short story, novel.
Kara Miller (living, Jamaica/England), screenwriter
Kirsten Miller (b. 1973, United States), nv. in English
Leslie Adrienne Miller (b. 1956, United States), poet
Madeline Miller (b. 1978, United States), nv.
Minnie Myrtle Miller (1842–1882, United States), wr.
Rebecca Miller (b. 1962, United States), nv. & wr.
Ruth Miller (1919–1969, South Africa), poet & pw. in English
Mărgărita Miller-Verghy (1865–1953, Romania), fiction wr.
Kate Millett (1934–2017, United States), feminist
Arthenia J. Bates Millican (1920–2012, United States), poet and fiction wr.
Alice Milligan (1865–1953, Ireland), poet & wr.
Anna Millikin (1764 – post-1849, Ireland), nv.
Sarah Millin (1889–1968, South Africa), fiction wr. & autobiographer in English
Lia Mills (living, Ireland), nv.
Anchee Min (閔安琪, b. 1957, Chile/United States), nv. & memoir wr.
Denise Mina (b. 1966, Scotland), crime wr. & pw.
Marijane Minaberri (1926–2017), France/Basque Country, wr.
Haruka Minami (南かずか, living, Japan), manga creator
Kanan Minami (水波風南, b. 1979, Japan), manga creator
Bridget Minamore (b. 1991, England), poet, journalist, critic
Else Holmelund Minarik (1920–2012, Denmark/United States), ch. wr.
Marga Minco (b. 1920, Netherlands), wr. & Hc. survivor
Liliana Díaz Mindurry (b. 1953, Argentina), poet & fiction wr.
Kazuya Minekura (峰倉かずや, b. 1975, Japan), manga creator
Guðrún Eva Mínervudóttir (b. 1976, Iceland), nv.
Laura Mintegi (b. 1955, Spain), nv. & es. in Basque
Mirabai (c. 1498 – c. 1547, India), poet
Ana Miranda (b. 1951, Brazil), nv.
Mir-Jam (1887–1952, Serbia), nv.
Heidi Safia Mirza (b. 1958, England), non-f. wr.
Shazia Mirza (living, Pakistan/England), col. & comedian
Jane Misme (1865–1935, France), col. & feminist
Jaishree Misra (living, India/England), nv.
Gabriela Mistral (Lucila Godoy Alcayaga, 1889–1957, China), poet; Nobel Prize in Literature
Diana Mitchell (1932–2016, Zimbabwe), political wr.
Dreda Say Mitchell (b. 1965, England), nv. & col.
Elma Mitchell (1919–2000, Scotland), poet
Elyne Mitchell (1913–2002, Australia), ch. wr.
Gladys Mitchell (1901–1983, England), mystery nv.
Margaret Mitchell (1900–1949, United States), col. & nv.; Gone with the Wind
Susan Mitchell (b. 1944, United States), poet, es. & translator
Susan Langstaff Mitchell (1866–1926, Ireland), writer, satirist & poet
Naomi Mitchison (1897–1999, Scotland), nv. & poet
Jessica Mitford (1917–1996, England/United States), wr. & rights activist
Mary Russell Mitford (1787–1855, England), nv. & pw.; Our Village
Nancy Mitford (1904–1973, England), nv. & correspondent; The Pursuit of Love
Antonija Mitrović (living, Serbia/New Zealand), computer scientist
Mitsukazu Mihara (三原ミツカズ, b. 1970, Japan), manga creator
Suzue Miuchi (美内すずえ, b. 1951, Japan), manga creator
Shion Miura (三浦しをん, b. 1976, Japan), nv.
Kim Mi-wol (김미월, b. 1977, Korea), fiction wr.
Miyamoto Yuriko (宮本百合子, 1899–1951, Japan), fiction wr., critic & activist
Minae Mizumura (水村 美苗, b. 1951, Japan/United States), nv., critic & es.
Hideko Mizuno (水野英子, b. 1939, Japan), manga creator
Junko Mizuno (水野純子, b. 1973, Japan), manga creator
Setona Mizushiro (水城せとな, b. 1971, Japan), manga creator

Mj–My
Barbara Catharina Mjödh (1738–1776, Finland), poet
Alice-Leone Moats (1908–1989, Mexico), non-f. wr.
Azadeh Moaveni (b. 1976, Iran/Persia/United States), wr.
Janet Mock (b. 1983, United States), wr., rights activist & wr.
Béláné Mocsáry (1845–1917, Hungary), travel wr.
Drusilla Modjeska (b. 1946, Australia), wr. & editor
Moelona (Elizabeth Mary Jones, 1877–1953, Wales), nv., ch. wr. & translator
Moero or Myro (3rd century BC, Ancient Greece), poet
Lottie Moggach (living, England), nv.
Moh Youn-sook (모윤숙, 1910–1999, Korea), poet
Nadifa Mohamed (b. 1981, Saint Lucia/England), nv.
Baisali Mohanty (b. 1994, India), wr., col. & dancer
Elaine Mokhtefi (b. 1928, United States/France), mem. & col.
Ana María Moix (1947–2014, Spain), poet & fiction wr.
Tze Ming Mok (莫志明, b. 1978, China/New Zealand), fiction wr. & social commentator
Malika Mokeddem (b. 1949, Algeria), fiction wr.
Natalia Molebatsi (living, South Africa), poet in English
Mary Louisa Molesworth (1839–1921, England), ch. nv.
Rena Molho (b. 1946, Greece), historian
Ursule Molinaro (1916–2000, France/United States), fiction wr., pw. & visual artist
Empar Moliner (b. 1966, Spain), wr. in Catalan
Grace Mera Molisa (1947–2002, Vanuatu), poet, politician & activist
Atukuri Molla (1440–1530, India), poet
Herdis Møllehave (1936–2001, Denmark), wr. & social worker
Dorothy Molloy (1942–2004, Ireland/Spain), poet, col. & artist
Frances Molloy (1947–1991, Ireland), fiction wr.
Marion Molteno (b. 1944, South Africa), nv. & education wr. in English
Eva Moltesen (1871–1934, Finland/Denmark), fiction & political wr. & lexicographer
Margareta Momma (1702–1772, Sweden), political wr.
Lília Momplé (b. 1935, Mozambique), fiction wr.
María Olivia Mönckeberg (b. 1944, Chile), es. & academic
Pérrine Moncrieff (1893–1979, England/New Zealand), conservationist & ornithologist
Patrocinio de Biedma y la Moneda (1858–1927, Spain), poet & nv.
Aleksandra Monedzhikova (1889–1959, Bulgaria), geographer & historian
Aja Monet (b. 1987, United States), poet, wr. & activist
Libuše Moníková (1945–1998, Czechoslovakia/Czech Republic/Germany), wr. in German
Mary Monck (c. 1677–1715, Ireland/England), poet & beauty
Jenn Monroe (b. 1970, United States), poet & editor
Beatrice Monroy (b. 1953, Italy), fiction wr. & nv.
Dolors Monserdà (1845–1919, Spain), poet, pw. & es.
Pilar Burgués Monserrat (b. 1958, Andorra), fiction wr.
Lady Mary Wortley Montagu (1689–1762, England), poet, diarist & correspondent
Hilda Montaire (1922–2004, Philippines), fiction wr. in Cebuana
Stephanie de Montalk (b. 1945, New Zealand), poet & biographer
Danila Comastri Montanari (b. 1948, Italy), nv.
Roza Montazemi (c. 1921–2009, Iran/Persia), cookery wr.
Dora Montefiore (1851–1933, Australia), poet, autobiographer & suffragist
Ana Montenegro (1915–2006, Brazil), wr., poet & activist
Sofía Montenegro (b. 1954, Nicaragua), social researcher
Mayra Montero (b. 1952, Cuba/Puerto Rico), fiction wr. & col.
Rosa Montero (b. 1951, Spain), fiction wr.
Graciela Montes (b. 1947, Argentina), ch. wr. & translator
Maria Montessori (1870–1952, Italy), education wr.
Florence Montgomery (1843–1923, England), ch. wr.
Lucy Maud Montgomery (1874–1942, Canada/Newfoundland), fiction wr. & poet; Anne of Green Gables
Ruth Montgomery (1912–2001, United States), nv.
Selena Montgomery, pseudonym of Stacey Abrams (b. 1973, United States), nv.
Amy Monticello (b. 1982, United States), es. & non-f. wr.
Isabelle de Montolieu (1851–1932, Switzerland), nv. in French
Federica Montseny (1905–1994, Spain), nv. & es.
María de Montserrat (1913–1995, Uruguay), fiction wr.
Teresa Wilms Montt (Tebal, 1893–1921, Chile), wr. & poet
Susanna Moodie (1803–1885, Canada/Newfoundland), diarist, nv. & poet
Anne Moody (1940–2015, United States), autobiographer
Moon Chung-hee (문정희, b. 1947, Korea), poet
Marente de Moor (b. 1972, Netherlands), nv. & col.
Alison Moore (b. 1971, England), nv.
C. L. Moore (1911–1987, United States), fantasy wr.
Lisa Moore (b. 1964, Canada/Newfoundland), fiction wr.
Lorrie Moore (b. 1957, United States), fiction wr.
Marianne Moore (1887–1972, United States), poet
Ruth Moore (1903–1989, United States), fiction wr. & poet
Elizabeth Moorhead (c. 1865–1955, United States), fiction wr.
Finola Moorhead (b. 1947, Australia), nv., pw. & poet
Hortensia von Moos (1659–1715, Switzerland), scholar & medic
Shani Mootoo (b. 1957, Trinidad/Canada/Newfoundland), wr., artist & video maker
Magdalena Mora (1952–1981, Mexico), scholar & social wr.
Terézia Mora (b. 1971, Hungary/Germany), nv. & critic in German
Barbara Moraff (b. 1939, United States), poet
Cherrie Moraga (b. 1952), poet, pw. & es.
Adelaida García Morales (1945–2014, Spain), fiction wr.
Aurora Levins Morales (b. 1954, Paraguay), es., poet & fiction wr.
Karly Gaitán Morales (b. 1980, Nicaragua), wr. on film
María Luz Morales (1889–1980, Spain), wr.
Giuliana Morandini (1938–2019, Italy), social wr. & nv.
Elsa Morante (1912–1985, Italy), nv.
Maria Moravskaya (1890–1947, Russia/United States), poet & critic
Ann Moray (1909–1981, Ireland/United States), nv. & singer
Yolanda Morazzo (1928–2009, Cape Verde), poet
Marta Morazzoni (b. 1950, Italy), nv.
Dea Trier Mørch (1941–2001, Denmark), travel & social wr. & artist
Diana Mordasini (living, Senegal/Switzerland), col.
Elinor Mordaunt (1872–1942, Australia/England), wr. & traveler
Pamela Mordecai (b. 1942, Jamaica/Canada/Newfoundland), poet, fiction wr. & scholar
Hannah More (1745–1833, England), moralist, poet & pw.
Helga Moreira (b. 1950, Paraguay), poet
Nancy Morejón (b. 1944, Cuba), poet & es.
Isabel Morel (1885–?, Chile), wr. & activist
Mary L. Moreland (1859–1918, United States), minister, evangelist, suffragist, wr.
María Victoria Moreno (1939–2005, Spain), ch. & YA wr. in Galician
Virginia R. Moreno (1925–2021, Philippines), poet & pw.
C. E. Morgan (b. 1976, United States), wr.
Elaine Morgan (1920–2013, Wales), pw. & anthropologist
Elena Puw Morgan (1900–1973, Wales), nv. & ch. wr.
Sydney, Lady Morgan (c. 1781–1859, Ireland/England), nv. & poet
Erin Morgenstern (b. 1978, United States), artist & nv.
Irmtraud Morgner (1933–1990, Germany), nv.
Sally Morgan (b. 1951, Australia), wr. & artist
Liane Moriarty (b. 1966, Australia), nv.
Sinead Moriarty (b. c. 1871, Ireland/England), nv.
Milk Morinaga (森永みるく, living, Japan), manga creator
Akiko Morishima (森島明子, b. 1973, Japan), manga creator
Tama Morita (森田たま, 1894–1970, Japan), es.
Yunna Morits (b. 1937, Soviet Union/Russia), poet & activist
Yoko Moriwaki (森脇瑤子, 1932–1945, Japan), diarist & Hiroshima victim
Margarita Morozova (1873–1958, Russia), mem.
Lisa Morpurgo (1923–1998, Italy), astrologer & nv.
Isabella di Morra (c. 1520–1545/1546), poet
Edita Morris (1902–1988, Sweden/United States), fiction wr. & mem.
Jan Morris (James Morris, 1926–2020, Wales/England), historian & travel wr.
Mary McGarry Morris (b. 1943, United States), nv.;
Meaghan Morris (b. 1950, Australia), cultural wr.
Myra Morris (1893–1966, Australia), poet, nv. & ch. wr.
Paula Morris (b. 1965, New Zealand), fiction wr.
Sharon Morris (living, Wales), poet & lecturer
Toni Morrison (1931–2019, United States), nv., ch. wr.; 1993 Nobel Prize in Literature
Di Morrissey (b. 1943, Australia), nv.
Donna Morrissey (b. 1956, Canada/Newfoundland), nv. & screenwriter
Sinéad Morrissey (b. 1972, Northern Ireland), poet
Sally Morrison (b. 1946, Australia), biographer & fiction wr.
Honoré Willsie Morrow (1880–1940, United States), nv., ss. wr.
Petra Morsbach (b. 1956, Germany), nv.
Penelope Mortimer (1918–1999, Wales/England), nv.
Nelle Morton (1905–1987, United States), theologian and rights leader
Shola Mos-Shogbamimu (b. 1975, England), non-f
Stefania Mosca (1957–2009, Venezuela), wr.
Myriam Moscona (b. 1955, Mexico/Canada/Newfoundland), academic & poet in Ladino & Spanish
Claudia Moscovici (b. 1969, Romania/United States), nv. & critic
Hannah Moscovitch (b. 1978, Canada/Newfoundland), pw.
Marie Moser (b. 1948, Canada/Newfoundland), fiction wr.
Miriam Mosessohn (1839–1920, Russia/Lithuania), Hebraist
Ottessa Moshfegh (b. 1981, United States), fiction wr. & es.
Minoo Moshiri (living, Iran/Persia), critic & es.
Tatyana Moskvina (1958–2022, Soviet Union/Russia), col., nv. & film critic
Mieke Mosmuller (b. 1951, Netherlands), nv. & physician
Mary Moss (1864–1914, United States), nv. & es.
Rose Moss (b. 1937, South Africa/United States), fiction & non-f. wr.
Sarah Moss (b. 1975, England), wr. & academic
Thylias Moss (b. 1954, United States), poet, ch. nv. & pw.
Kate Mosse (b. 1961, England), fiction wr. & broadcaster
Ahlam Mosteghanemi (b. 1953, Algeria), nv.
Natasha Mostert (living, South Africa/England), nv.
Nadežka Mosusova (b. 1928, Serbia), non-f. wr.
Isabella Motadinyane (1963–2003, South Africa), poet & actor in several languages
Yukiko Motoya (本谷有希子, b. 1979, Japan), nv. & pw.
Capucine Motte (b. 1971, Belgium), woman of letters in French
Chantal Mouffe (b. 1943, Belgium), political theorist in French & English
Touhfat Mouhtare (living, Comoros), wr.
Daphne Pochin Mould (1920–2014, England/Ireland), non-f. wr.
Julia Moulden (b. 1956, Canada/Newfoundland), non-f. wr. & speechwr.
Jeanine Moulin (1912–1998, Belgium), poet & scholar
Martha Moulsworth (1577–1646, England), poet & autobiographer
Maria Lacerda de Moura (1887–1945, Brazil), anarcho-feminist wr.
Kenizé Mourad (b. 1939, France), nv.
Teresa Moure (b. 1969, Spain), es., nv. & ch. wr. in Galician
Doula Mouriki (1934–1991, Greece), art historian
Granaz Moussavi (b. 1976, Iran/Persia/Australia), poet
Elizabeth Moutzan-Martinegou (1801–1832, Greece), poet, pw. & economist
Mary Braidwood Mowle (1827–1857, England/Australia), diarist
Ana Gloria Moya (1954–2013, Argentina), nv.
Isabel Moya (1961–2018, Cuba), communications professor
Esther Moyal (1878–1948, Lebanon), Jewish wr. & feminist
Fiona Mozley (b. 1988, England), nv. & medievalist
Milena Mrazović (1863–1927, Austria/Austria-Hungary/Yugoslavia), wr. in Serbian
Zorica Mršević (b. 1954, Serbia), wr. on gender rights
Ingy Mubiayi (b. 1972, Egypt/Italy), wr.
Cristina Mucci (b. 1949, Argentina), wr.
Muddupalani (fl. mid-18th century, India), poet & nun
Chitra Mudgal (b. 1943, India), nv.
Lisel Mueller (1924–2020, Germany/United States), poet
Amélia Muge (b. 1952, Mozambique/Portugal), lyricist & singer
Micere Githae Mugo (b. 1942, Kenya), pw., poet & activist
Hazel de Silva Mugot (b. 1947, Kenya), nv. & academic
Nezihe Muhiddin (1889–1958, Turkey/Ottoman Empire), political wr.
Luise Mühlbach (1814–1873, Germany), nv.
Hermynia zur Mühlen (1883–1951, Austria/Austria-Hungary/England), nv.
Doris Mühringer (1920–2009, Austria/Austria-Hungary), poet & fiction & ch. wr.
Willa Muir (1890–1970, Scotland), wr.
Hercilia Fernández de Mujía (1860–1929, Bolivia), wr. & poet
María Josefa Mujía (1812–1888, Bolivia), poet
Bharati Mukherjee (1940–2017, India/United States), fiction wr.
Lena Mukhina (1924–1991, Soviet Union), teenage diarist
Luise Mühlbach (1814–1873, Germany), nv.
Hermynia zur Mühlen (1883–1951, Austria/Austria-Hungary/England), nv.
Kathleen Mulchrone (1895–1973, Ireland), Celtic scholar
Elisabeth Mulder (1904–1987, Spain), poet & critic
Lale Müldür (b. 1956, Turkey/Ottoman Empire), poet & fiction wr.
Wendy Mulford (b. 1941, Wales), poet & feminist
Clara Mulholland (1849–1934, Ireland), nv., pw., ch. wr.
Rosa Mulholland (1841–1921, Ireland), nv., poet & pw.
Val Mulkerns (1925–2018, Ireland), fiction wr. & col.
Harryette Mullen (b. 1953, United States), poet, fiction wr. & scholar
Henrietta Müller (1846–1906, Chile/England), activist & theosophist
Herta Müller (b. 1953, Romania/Germany), nv. & poet; 2009 Nobel Prize in Literature
Inge Müller (1925–1966, Germany), poet, ch. wr. & radio pw.
Melissa Müller (b. 1967, Austria/Austria-Hungary), nv. & biographer
Sheila Mulloy (1922–2013, Ireland), wr. & historian
Margaret Mulvihill (b. 1954, Ireland), fiction & non-f. wr.
Khadija Mumtaz (b. 1955, India), nv., es. & physician
Hilda Mundy (1912–1980, Bolivia), wr., poet, journalist
Alina Mungiu-Pippidi (b. 1964, Romania), political wr. & pw.
Zorica Jevremović Munitić (b. 1948, Serbia), pw. & literary historian
Estefanía Muñiz (b. 1974, Spain), screenwriter, poet & critic
Angelina Muñiz-Huberman (b. 1936, Mexico), fiction wr. & poet
Claudine Muno (b. 1979, Luxembourg), wr.
Isabel Gómez Muñoz (b. 1959, Chile), poet
Isabel Muñoz-Caravaca (1838–1915, Spain), education wr.
Rosabetty Muñoz (b. 1960, Chile), poet & academic
Alice Munro (b. 1931, Canada/Newfoundland), fiction wr.; 2013 Nobel Prize in Literature
Johanne Münter (1844–1921, Denmark), wr. & rights activist
Rose Marie Muraro (1930–2014, Brazil), sociologist & feminist wr.
Kiyoko Murata (村田喜代子, b. 1945, Japan), fiction wr.
Sayaka Murata (村田沙耶香, b. 1979, Japan), nv.
Yuka Murayama (村山由佳, b. 1964, Japan), nv.
Iris Murdoch (1919–1999, Ireland/England), nv. & philosopher; The Sea, the Sea
Nina Murdoch (1890–1976, Australia), biographer, travel wr. & poet
Weronika Murek (b. 1989, Poland),  pw., short story wr.
Mary Noailles Murfree (1850–1922, United States), fiction wr.
Michela Murgia (b. 1972, Italy), nv.
Verónica Murguía (b. 1960, Mexico), nv. & ch. wr.
Anna Murià (1904–2002, Spain), fiction & ch. wr. & es.
Rosario Murillo (b. 1951, Nicaragua), poet
Mayumi Muroyama (室山まゆみ, b. 1955, Japan) and Mariko Muroyama (室山真里子, b. 1957, Japan), joint manga creators
Sallyann J. Murphey (living, England/United States), nv.
Agnes G. Murphy (1865–1931, Ireland/England), col. & biographer
C. E. Murphy (b. 1973, United States), wr.
Dervla Murphy (1931–2022, Ireland), touring cyclist & travel wr.
Elaine Murphy (living, Ireland), pw.
Jill Murphy (1949–2021, England), ch. wr. & illustrator
Kathleen M. Murphy (1879–1963, Ireland), poet
Margaret Murphy (b. 1959, England), crime wr.
Maura Murphy (1928–2005, Ireland/England), autobiographer
Edmée Pardo Murray (b. 1965, Mexico), fiction & ch. wr.
Ena Murray (1936–2015, South Africa), nv. & poet in Afrikaans
Nora J Murray (1888–1955, Ireland), poet & schoolteacher
Pauli Murray (1910–1985, United States), activist, lawyer, poet & mem.
Sally-Ann Murray (b. 1961, South Africa), poet & nv. in English
Shirley Murray (1931–2020, New Zealand), hymn wr.
Joanna Murray-Smith (b. 1962, Australia), pw., screenwriter & nv.
Sudha Murty (b. 1950, India), wr. & educator
Eugénie Musayidire (b. 1952, Rwanda/Germany), wr.
Inga Muscio (b. 1966, United States), wr.
Susan Musgrave (b. 1951, Canada/Newfoundland), poet & ch. wr.
Małgorzata Musierowicz (b. 1945, Poland), ch. & YA wr.
Carol Muske-Dukes (b. 1945, United States), poet, nv. & academic
Seema Mustafa (b. 1955, India), wr. & politician
Sugawara no Takasue no musume (菅原孝標女, c. 1008–post-1059, Japan), diarist
Dagmar von Mutius (1919–2008, Germany), wr.
Charlotte Mutsaers (b. 1942, Netherlands), wr. & painter
Margaret Mutu (living, New Zealand), wr. on Maori
Mwana Kupona (died c. 1865, Kenya), poet
Beverle Graves Myers (b. 1951, United States), mystery wr.
Agatha Lovisa de la Myle (1724–1787, Germany/Finland), poet & writer in German & Latvian
Alva Myrdal (1902–1976, Sweden), sociologist

N

Na–Ng
Na Hye-sok (나혜석, 1896–1948, Korea), poet, educator & painter
Asma Nabeel (1970s–2021, Pakistan), screenwriter & poet
Farida Nabourema (b. 1990, Togo), wr. & activist
Borbála Nádasdy (b. 1939, Hungary/France), nv. & cookery wr.
Sofia Nădejde (1856–1946, Romania), fiction wr. & pw.
Constance Naden (1858–1889, England), poet & philosopher
Azar Nafisi (b. 1948, Iran/Persia), wr. & academic; Reading Lolita in Tehran
Ai Nagai (b. 1951, Japan), pw. & director
Angela Nagle (b. 1984, Ireland), academic & non-f. wr.
Maria de Naglowska (1883–1936, Russia/Switzerland), poet & occultist
Beverley Naidoo (b. 1943, South Africa/England), ch. wr.
Natalya Alexeyevna of Russia (1673–1716, Russia), pw.
Vera Nazarian (b. 1966, Soviet Union), nv.
Kishwar Naheed (b. 1940, India/Pakistan), poet & ch. wr.
Alice Nahon (1896–1933, Belgium), poet in Flemish
Sarojini Naidu (1879–1949, India), poet & activist
Anita Nair (b. 1966, India), nv.
Carolina Nairne (1766–1845, Scotland), songwriter
Cheng Naishan (程乃珊, 1946–2013, China), fiction & non-f. wr.
Layal Najib (1983–2006, Lebanon), col. & war victim
Afsaneh Najmabadi (b. 1946, Iran/Persia), historian & gender theorist
Marie von Najmajer (1844–1904, Austria/Austria-Hungary), nv., poet & pw.
Rieko Nakagawa (中川李枝子, b. 1935, Japan), ch. wr.
Aya Nakahara (中原アヤ, b. 1973, Japan), manga creator
Kyoko Nakajima (中島京子, b. 1964, Japan), nv. & es.
Hisaya Nakajo (中条比紗也, b. 1973, J., manga creator
Hikaru Nakamura (中村光, b. 1984, Japan), manga creator
Yoshiki Nakamura (仲村佳樹, b. 1969, Japan), manga creator
Midori Nakano (中野翠, b. 1946, Japan), col. & es.
Nakatsukasa (中務, 912–991, Japan), poet
Kei Nakazawa (中沢けい, Japan), fiction wr. & academic
Bahiyyih Nakhjavani (living, Iran/Persia), nv.
Anna Nakwaska (1781–1851, Poland), mem., nv. & ch. wr.
Zofia Nałkowska (1884–1954, Poland), nv. & pw.
Beverley Nambozo (living, Uganda), poet, fiction wr. & biographer
Suniti Namjoshi (b. 1941, India), poet & fable wr.
Glaydah Namukasa (living, Uganda), fiction & YA wr.
Madlen Namro (living, Poland), mem.
Glaydah Namukasa (living, Uganda), nv. & midwife
Kiriko Nananan (魚喃キリコ, b. 1972, Japan), manga creator
Meera Nanda (b. 1954, India/United States), religious wr. & science historian
Rebecca Nandwa (living, Kenya), ch. wr.
Elizabeth Nannestad (b. 1956, New Zealand), poet
Heo Nanseolheon (허초희, 1563–1589, Korea), poet
Claire Julie de Nanteuil (1834–1897, France), child wr.
Elma Napier (1892–1973, Scotland/Dominica), wr. & politician
Susan Napier (b. 1954, New Zealand), nv.
Rafaela Chacón Nardi (1926–2001, Cuba), poet & educator
Ruth Narramore (1923–2010, United States), wr., editor & musician
Mary Nash (b. 1947, Ireland), historian
Thirza Nash (1885–1962, South Africa), nv. in English
Octavia Nasr (b. 1966, Lebanon), col.
Emily Nasrallah (1931–2018, Lebanon), nv. & ch. wr.
Taslima Nasrin (b. 1962, India), nv., poet & es.
Khurshidbanu Natavan (1832–1897, Azerbaijan), poet in Azerbaijani & Persian
Badam Natawan (1924–1988, India/Pakistan), wr.
Sheila Natusch (1926–2017, New Zealand), natural history wr. & illustrator
Benedikte Naubert (1752–1819, Germany), nv.
Jerónima Nava y Saavedra (1669–1727, New Kingdom of Granada), autobiographer & Catholic religious
Marguerite de Navarre (1492–1549, France), poet, pw. & fiction wr.
Marysa Navarro (b. 1934, Spain), es.
Ofelia Domínguez Navarro (1894–1976, Cuba), wr. & activist
Gloria Naylor (1950–2016, United States), nv.
Sarwat Nazir (living, Pakistan), fiction wr., screenwriter & pw.
Bongi Ndaba (b. 1972, South Africa), TV wr. & pw. in English
Marie NDiaye (b. 1967, France), nv. & pw.
Mariama Ndoye (b. 1953, Senegal/Tunisia), fiction wr.
Emma Neale (b. 1969, New Zealand), nv. & poet
Mary Anna Needell (1830–1922, England), nv.
Barbara Neely (1941–2020, United States), nv.
Ada Negri (1870–1945, Italy), poet & nv.
María Negroni (b. 1951, Argentina), poet & wr.
Samira Negrouche (b. 1988, Algeria), poet, wr. & physician
Lino Nelisi (b. 1952, Niue/New Zealand), wr. in Pacific languages
Alice Dunbar Nelson (1875–1935, United States), poet, col. & activist
Esther Nelson (1810–1843, Isle of Man), poet
Marina Nemat (b. 1965, Iran/Persia/Canada/Newfoundland), mem.
Božena Němcová (1820–1862, Austria/Austria-Hungary/Hungary), Czech Revival wr.
Cristina Nemerovschi (b. 1980, Romania), nv.
Irène Némirovsky (1903–1942, Ukraine/France), nv.
Mary Edith Nepean (1876–1960, Wales), nv.
Salomėja Nėris (1904–1945, Lithuania/Soviet Union), poet
Adalgisa Nery (1905–1980, Brazil), poet & prose wr.
E. Nesbit (1858–1924, England), ch. fiction wr.
Bára Nesvadbová (b. 1975, Czechoslovakia/Czech Republic), wr. & col.
Guadalupe Nettel (b. 1973, Mexico), fiction wr. & es.
Friederike Caroline Neuber (1697–1760, Germany), pw. & actor
Jill Neville (1932–1997, Australia), nv., pw. & poet
Kate Newmann (b. 1965, Ireland), poet
Aimee Nezhukumatathil (b. 1974, United States), poet & es.
Juliana Makuchi Nfah-Abbenyi (living, Cameroon), wr. & academic
Clara Ng (b. 1973, Indonesia), fiction & ch. wr.
Lauretta Ngcobo (1931–2015, South Africa), nv. & es. in English

Ni–Nz
Brenda Niall (b. 1930, Australia), biographer & critic
Cláir Ní Aonghusa (b. 1953, Ireland), nv. & poet
Colette Nic Aodha (b. 1967, Ireland), poet & wr.
Giulia Niccolai (1934–2021, Italy), poet & nv.
Síle Ní Chéileachair (1924–1985, Ireland), fiction wr.
Dairena Ní Chinnéide (b. 1969, Ireland), poet
Caitríona Ní Chléirchín (living, Ireland), wr. & academic
Jill Nicholls (living, England), filmmaker & Journalist
Christine Nicholls (b. 1943, Kenya/England), lexicographer
Marjory Nicholls (1890–1930, New Zealand), poet & educator
Grace Nichols (b. 1950, Guyana/England), poet
Joyce Nicholson (1919–2001, Australia), wr.
Mavis Nicholson (1930–2022, Wales), wr. & broadcaster
Eibhlín Dubh Ní Chonaill (c. 1743 – c. 1800, Ireland), poet
Nuala Ní Chonchúir (b. 1970, Ireland), wr. & poet
Eiléan Ní Chuilleanáin (b. 1942, Ireland), poet & academic
Annemarie Ní Churreáin (living, Ireland), poet
Paige Nick (living, South Africa), nv. & col. in English
Nuala Níc Con Iomaire (died 2010, Ireland), pw., poet & artist
Nuala Ní Dhomhnaill (b. 1952, Ireland), poet
Máire Ní Dhonnchadha Dhuibh (c. 1702 – c. 1795, Ireland), poet
Éilís Ní Dhuibhne (b. 1954, Ireland), fiction wr.
Ciara Ní É (living, Ireland), poet & wr.
Lorine Niedecker (1903–1970, United States), poet
Aīda Niedra (1899–1972, Latvia), nv. & poet
Marlene van Niekerk (b. 1954, South Africa), nv. in Afrikaans
Henriette Nielsen (1815–1900, Denmark), pw. & nv.
Charlotte Niese (1854–1935, Germany), wr. & poet
Sandra Rodríguez Nieto (living, Mexico), wr. on crime
Audrey Niffenegger (b. 1963, United States), nv. & artist
Zehra Nigah (b. 1937, India/Pakistan), poet & scriptwriter
Nigâr Hanım (1856–1918, Turkey/Ottoman Empire), poet
Ailbhe Ní Ghearbhuigh (b. 1984, Ireland), poet
Áine Ní Ghlinn (living, Ireland), poet, pw. & ch. wr.
Máiréad Ní Ghráda (1896–1971, Ireland), poet & pw.
Doireann Ní Ghríofa (b. 1981, Ireland), poet
Sorcha Ní Ghuairim (1911–1976, Ireland), wr. & singer
Lady Nijō (後深草院二条, 1258 – post-1307, Japan), poet & mem.
Maria Nikolaeva (b. 1971, Soviet Union/Russia), wr. on yoga
Milena Nikolova (b. 1984, Bulgaria), poet & wr.
Deborah Niland (b. 1950, Australia), ch. wr. & illustrator
Elly Niland (b. 1954, Guyana/England), poet, pw. & educator
Máire Bhuí Ní Laoghaire (1774 – c. 1848, Ireland), poet
Bríd Ní Mhóráin (b. 1951, Ireland), poet
Jenny Nimmo (b. 1944, Wales), ch. wr. & nv.
Anaïs Nin (1903–1977, France), eroticist, critic & diarist
Anupama Niranjana (1934–1991, India), fiction & non-f. wr. & physician
Ailís Ní Ríain (b. 1974, Ireland), pw. & composer
Esther Nirina (1932–2004, Malaysia), poet
Siobhán Ní Shúilleabháin (1928–2013, Ireland), pw. & wr.
Kanako Nishi (西加奈子, b. 1977, Japan), fiction & ch. wr. & illustrator
Keiko Nishi (西炯子, b. 1966, Japan), manga creator
Yoshiko Nishitani (西谷祥子, b. 1943, Japan), manga creator
Ana María Martínez de Nisser (1812–1872, Comoros), wr. & soldier
Rosa Nissán (born 1939, Mexico), wr.
Niu Yingzhen (8th century, China), poet
Sister Nivedita (1867–1911, England), wr.
Ketty Nivyabandi (b. 1978, Burundi), poet & activist
Marie Nizet (1859–1922, Belgium), poet in French
Lela B. Njatin (b. 1963, Yugoslavia/Slovenia), fiction wr. & artist
Rebeka Njau (b. 1932, Kenya), pw. & nv.
Nkiru Njoku (b. c. 1980, Nigeria), screenwriter
Michelle Nkamankeng (b. c. 2008, South Africa), nv. in English
Anna de Noailles (1876–1933, Romania/France), wr. in French
Ellen Kyle Noel (1815–1873, Ireland/Canada/Newfoundland), nv.
Noh Cheonmyeong (노천명, 1912–1957, Korea), poet
Florence Noiville (b. 1961, France), fiction & ch. wr.
Cynthia Reed Nolan (1908–1976, Australia), nv. & travel wr.
Ingrid Noll (b. 1935, Germany), nv.
Oodgeroo Noonuccal (Kath Walker, 1920–1993, Australia), poet, activist & educator
Saskia Noort (b. 1967, Netherlands), crime wr.
Kerstin Norborg (b. 1961, Sweden), wr. & poet
Cecily Norden (1918–2011, South Africa), wr. in English on horse riding
Hedvig Charlotta Nordenflycht (1718–1763, Sweden), poet & salonnière
Clara Nordström (1886–1962, Sweden/Germany), nv. in German
Lise Nørgaard (1917–2023, Denmark), es. & fiction wr.
Regine Normann (1867–1939, Norway), fiction wr.
Dagmar Normet (1921–2008, Estonia), wr. & pw.
Kathleen Norris (1880–1966, United States), nv.
Marlene Norst (1930–2010, Austria/Austria-Hungary/Australia), linguist & educator
Marisela Norte (living, United States), poet & wr.
Gail North-Saunders (b. 1944, Bahamas), historian & archivist
Andre Norton (1912–2005, United States), fiction wr.
Caroline Norton (1808–1877, England), wr., reformer & feminist
Eva Norvind (1944–2006, Norway/Mexico), screenwriter
Julian of Norwich (1342–1416, England), mystic
Nossis (fl. c. 300 BC, Ancient Greece), epigrammist & poet
Christine Nöstlinger (1936–2018, Austria/Austria-Hungary), ch. wr.
Amélie Nothomb (b. 1966, Belgium), nv. in French
Alice Notley (b. 1945, United States), poet
Joanne Nova (living, Australia), science wr. & speaker
Helga M. Novak (1935–2013, Germany), poet & wr.
Anna Novakov (b. 1959, Serbia), art historian & critic
Mary Novik (b. 1945, Canada/Newfoundland), nv.
Lili Novy (1885–1958, Austria/Austria-Hungary/Yugoslavia), poet in Slovenian
Perpétue Nshimirimana (b. 1961, Burundi), wr.
Mpho 'M'atsepo Nthunya (fl. 1990s, Lesotho), autobiographer
Liz Nugent (b. 1967, Ireland), nv.
Princess Nukata (額田王, fl. 7th century, Japan), poet
Elizabeth Nunez (b. c. 1944, Trinidad/United States), nv. & academic
Patricia Alvarado Nuñez (Pm/United States), screenwriter
Minni Nurme (1917–1994, Estonia), nv. & poet
Sevinj Nurugizi (b. 1964, Azerbaijan), ch. wr.
Martina Nwakoby (b. 1937, Nigeria), ch. wr. & nv.
Flora Nwapa (1931–1993, Nigeria), nv.
Adaobi Tricia Nwaubani (b. 1976, Nigeria), nv. & es.
Julia Nyberg (1784–1854, Sweden), poet & songwriter
Monica Arac de Nyeko (b. 1979, Uganda), fiction wr., poet & es.
Saigū no Nyōgo (霧賀ユキ, 929–985, Japan), poet
Colette Nys-Mazure (b. 1939, Belgium), poet & pw. in French
Carita Nyström (1940–2019, Finland), wr. & poet in Swedish
Sekai Nzenza (living, Zimbabwe), wr. & critic

O

Olivia Levison (1847–1894, Denmark), Danish author and writer
Ann Oakley (b. 1944, England), academic & nv.
Joyce Carol Oates (b. 1938, United States), fiction wr., poet & pw.
María Olimpia de Obaldía (1891–1985, Panama), poet
Kathy O'Beirne (1956–2019, Ireland), mem.
Achy Obejas (b. 1956, Cg), wr. & poet
Charlotta Öberg (also Lotta Öberg; 1818–1856, Sweden), poet
Clara Obligado (b. 1950, Argentina), fiction wr.
Trifonia Melibea Obono (b. 1982, Equatorial Guinea), nv. & political scientist
Téa Obreht (b. 1985, Serbia/United States), fiction wr.
Kathleen O'Brennan (1876–1948, Ireland), pw. & activist
Lily O'Brennan (1878–1948, Ireland), writer, pw. & activist
Princess Anka Obrenović (1821–1868, Serbia), Serbia's first woman wr.
Charlotte Grace O'Brien (1845–1909, Ireland), writer, philanthropist & plant collector
Edna O'Brien (b. 1930, Ireland), fiction wr.
Frances O'Brien (1840–1883, Ireland), poet & nv.
Kate O'Brien (1897–1974, Ireland), nv. & pw.
Mary-Louise O'Callaghan (living, Australia), non-f. wr.
Silvina Ocampo (1903–1993, Argentina), poet, fiction wr. & pw.
Victoria Ocampo (1890–1979, Argentina), critic & autobiographer
Raquel Ochoa (b. 1980, Portugal), nv., biographer & travel wr.
Helen O'Clery (1910–2006, Ireland), ch. wr.
Elizabeth O'Conner' (Anne Willard, 1913–2000, Australia), nv.
Flannery O'Connor (1925–1964, United States), fiction wr.
Gemma O'Connor (b. 1940, Ireland), mystery wr.
Niamh O'Connor (fl. since 2000, Ireland), nv. & col.
Tyne O'Connell (b. 1960, England), nv.
Asenath Bole Odaga (1937–2014, Kenya), nv., pw. & ch. wr.
Mary Barry O'Delaney (1862–1947, Ireland), story-teller & poet
Cristina Odone (b. 1960, Kenya/England), nv. & col.
Jessie Fremont O'Donnell (1860–1897, United States), wr.
Mary O'Donnell (b. 1954, Ireland), nv., poet & educator
Mietta O'Donnell (1950–2001, Australia), food wr. & chef
Mary O'Donoghue (b. 1975, Ireland), fiction wr. & poet
Nannie Lambert Power O'Donoghue (1843–1940, Ireland), poet & wr.
Irina Odoyevtseva (1895/1901–1990, Soviet Union/Russia), poet, nv. & mem.
Taiwo Odubiyi (b. 1965, Nigeria), nv. & ch. wr.
Okwiri Oduor (b. 1988/1989, Kenya), wr.
Marie Conway Oemler (1879–1932, United States), nv.
Julia O'Faolain (1932–2020, Ireland/United States), fiction wr.
Nuala O'Faolain (1940–2008, Ireland), nv., critic & mem.
Maggie O'Farrell (b. 1972, Northern Ireland/England), nv. & mem.
Ursula O'Farrell (b. 1934, Ireland), psychologist
Jenny Offill (b. 1968, United States), nv. & editor
Catherine O'Flynn (b. 1970, England), fiction wr.
Nana Oforiatta Ayim (living, Ghana/Gold Coast), wr. & art historian
Barbara Ogier (1648–1720, Flanders), pw.
Anna Ogino (荻野アンナ, b. 1956, Japan), nv. & academic
Nina Ognianova (living, Bulgaria), activist
Vida Ognjenović (b. 1941, Serbia), pw. & wr.
Margaret Ogola (1958–2011, Kenya), nv.
Grace Ogot (1930–2015, Kenya), fiction wr.
Molara Ogundipe (1940–2019, Nigeria), poet, critic & non-f. wr.
P. A. Ogundipe (1927–2020, Nigeria), fiction wr. & mem.
Birgül Oğuz (b. 1981, Turkey/Ottoman Empire), fiction wr. & academic
Ellen Oh, (living, United States), author
Oh Jung-hee (오정희, b. 1947, Korea), fiction wr.
Oh Soo-yeon (오수연, b. 1964, Korea), fiction wr. & es.
Sheila O'Hagan (living, Ireland), poet
Mariko Ōhara (大原まり子, b. 1959, Japan), science fiction wr.
Pixie O'Harris (Rhona Olive Harris, 1903–1991, Wales), wr. & artist
Nanase Ohkawa (大川七瀬, b. 1967, Japan), manga creator
Jane Ohlmeyer (living, Northern Ireland/Ireland), historian & academic
Margaret Ó hÓgartaigh (1967–2014, Ireland), historian & biographer
Shinobu Ohtaka (大高忍, b. 1983, Japan), manga creator
Liisi Ojamaa (1972–2019, Estonia), poet & critic
Mirta Ojito (b. 1964, Cuba), wr. & col.
Yeo Ok (여옥, between 15th & 1st century BC, Korea), poet
Mari Okada (岡田麿里, b. 1976, Japan), screenwriter & manga creator
Reiko Okano (岡野 玲子, b. 1960, Japan), manga creator
Meral Okay (1959–2012, Turkey/Ottoman Empire), screenwriter
Kyoko Okazaki (岡崎京子, b. 1963, Japan), manga creator
Adelaide O'Keeffe (1776–1865, Ireland), poet & nv.
Chioma Okereke (living, Nigeria), poet & fiction wr.
Susan Moller Okin (1946–2004, New Zealand), political wr.
Julie Okoh (b. 1947, Nigeria), pw. & educator
Irenosen Okojie (living, Nigeria/England), fiction wr.
Nnedi Okorafor (b. 1974, Nigeria/United States), fiction wr.
Juliane Okot Bitek (b. 1966, Kenya/Uganda), poet
Ifeoma Okoye (b. c. 1937, Nigeria), fiction & ch. wr.
Chinelo Okparanta (b. 1981, Nigeria/United States), fiction wr.
Sofi Oksanen (b. 1977, Finland), nv. & pw.
Princess Ōku (大来皇女, 661–702, Japan), poet
Mary Karooro Okurut (b. 1954, Uganda), fiction wr.
Sevin Okyay (b. 1942, Turkey/Ottoman Empire), critic & col.
Auður Ava Ólafsdóttir (b. 1958, Iceland), art historian, nv. & poet
Susana Olaondo (b. 1953, Uruguay), ch. wr. & illustrator
Sharon Olds (b. 1942, United States), poet
Annette K. Olesen (b. 1965, Denmark), screenwriter
Margaret Oliphant (1828–1897, Scotland), nv.
Ukamaka Olisakwe (b. 1982, Nigeria), fiction & screenwriter
Gloria Olive (1923–2006, United States/New Zealand), mathematician
Mary Oliver (1935–2019, United States), poet
Narelle Oliver (1960–2016), ch. wr. & artist
Marly de Oliveira (c. 1938–2007, Brazil), poet
Orlandina de Oliveira (b. 1943, Brazil/Mexico), social critic
Véronique Olmi (b. 1962, France), pw. & nv.
Ayodele Olofintuade (living, Nigeria), fiction & ch. wr.
Blanche Christine Olschak (1913–1989, Austria/Austria-Hungary), encyclopedist
Tillie Olsen (1913–2007, United States), feminist fiction wr.
Hagar Olsson (1893–1978, Finland), critic & pw. in Swedish
Linda Olsson (b. 1948, Sweden/New Zealand), nv. in Swedish & English
Lisa Olstein (b. 1972, United States), poet
Gilda Olvidado (b. 1957, Philippines), screenwriter & nv.
Ghazal Omid (b. c. 1971, Iran/Persia/Canada/Newfoundland), autobiographer
Nessa O'Mahony (living, Ireland), poet and wr.
Mary O'Malley (b. 1954, Ireland), poet
Bree O'Mara (1968–2010, South Africa), nv. in English
Kristín Ómarsdóttir (b. 1962, Iceland), nv., poet & pw.
Kathleen O'Meara (1839–1888, Ireland), nv. & biographer
Yewande Omotoso (b. 1980, Barbados/South Africa), nv.
Emine Semiye Önasya (1864–1944, Turkey/Ottoman Empire), political & education wr.
Riku Onda (恩田陸, b. 1964, Japan), nv.
Heather O'Neill (b. 1973, Canada/Newfoundland), fiction wr., poet & screenwriter
Louise O'Neill (b. 1985, Ireland), YA nv.
Geraldine O'Neill (b. 1955, Scotland/Ireland), nv.
Mary Devenport O'Neill (1879–1967, Ireland), poet & pw.
Moira O'Neill (Agnes Shakespeare Higginson, 1864–1955, Ireland/Can), poet
Gabriela Onetto (b. 1963, Uruguay), poet & fiction wr.
Makena Onjerika (living, Kenya), wr.
Fuyumi Ono (小野不由美, b. 1960, Japan), nv.
Hiromu Ono (小野弥夢, b. 1984, Japan), manga creator
Natsume Ono (オノナツメ, b. 1977, Japan), manga creator
Nuzo Onoh (b. 1962, Nigeria/England), horror wr.
Chibundu Onuzo (b. 1991, Nigeria), nv.
Osonye Tess Onwueme (b. 1955, Nigeria), pw., scholar & poet
Ifeoma Onyefulu (b. 1959, Nigeria), ch. wr. & nv.
Amelia Opie (1769–1853, England), nv. & biographer
Mary Oppen (1908–1990 United States), poet, wr. & artist
Meaghan Oppenheimer (b. 1986, US), screen wr.
Claudia Orange (b. 1938, New Zealand), historian
Baroness Orczy (1865–1947, Hungary/England), nv. & illustrator; The Scarlet Pimpernel
Patrice Ordas (1951–2019, France), nv. & comic wr.
Caitriona O'Reilly (b. 1973, Ireland), poet & critic
Emily O'Reilly (living, Ireland), col. & ombudsman
Margie Orford (b. 1964, England/South Africa), fiction, non-f. & ch. wr.
Doris Orgel (b. 1929, Austria/Austria-Hungary/England), ch. & non-f. wr. in English
Bukola Oriola (b. 1976, Nigeria/United States), col. & autobiographer
Iza Orjonikidze (1938–2010, Georgia (Caucasus)), poet & politician
Raisa Orlova (1918–1989, Soviet Union), mem.
Kate Orman (b. 1968, Australia), science fiction wr.
Margarita Ormotsadze (b. 1981, Ukraine), col., poet & wr.
Dorila Castell de Orozco (1845–1930, Uruguay), poet & educator
Olga Orozco (1920–1999, Argentina), poet & col.
Adela Orpen (1855–1927, United States/Ireland), fiction & non-f. wr.
Elvira Orphée (1930–2018, Argentina), fiction wr.
Sue Orr (b. 1962, New Zealand), fiction wr.
Hanne Ørstavik (b. 1969, Norway), nv.
Virginia Elena Ortea (1866–1906, Dominica), col. & nv.
Anna Maria Ortese (1914–1998, Italy), fiction & travel wr. & poet
Alicia Dujovne Ortiz (b. 1940, Argentina), poet, fiction wr. & biographer
Emilia Ortiz (1917–2012, Mexico), poet & cartoonist
Helena Araújo Ortiz (1934–2015, Colombia), feminist wr. & critic
Julia Anna Orum (1843-1904, United States), textbook wr.
Eliza Orzeszkowa (1841–1910, Poland), nv. & political wr.
Joanne van Os (b. 1955, Australia), fiction & ch. wr. & mem.
Beatrice Osborn (Margaret Fane, 1887–1962, Australia), nv. & poet
Pat O'Shea (1931–2007, Ireland), ch. wr.
Masumi Oshima (大島真寿美, b. 1962, Japan), nv.
Yumiko Ōshima (大島弓子, b. 1947, Japan), manga creator
Ayisha Osori (living, Nigeria), political wr.
Elvira Santa Cruz Ossa (1886–1960, Chile), pw. & nv.
Martha Ostenso (1900–1963, Norway/Canada/Newfoundland), nv. & screenwriter
Nan Inger Östman (1923–2015, Sweden), ch. wr.
Ljubica Ostojić (1945–2021, Yugoslavia/Bosnia-Herzegovina), poet, wr. & pw.
Leanne O'Sullivan (living, Ireland), poet
Maggie O'Sullivan (1908–1990, England), poet
Mary Josephine Donovan O'Sullivan (1887–1966, Ireland), historian & academic
Maureen Donovan O'Sullivan (1887–1966, Ireland), educator & historian
Suzanne O'Sullivan (living, Ireland), neurologist
Alice Oswald (b. 1966, England), poet
Yōko Ōta (大田 洋子, 1906–1963, Japan), nuclear war nv.
Ōtagaki Rengetsu (太田垣蓮月, 1791–1875, Japan), poet & calligrapher
Ōtomo no Sakanoue no Iratsume (大伴坂上郎女, c. 700–750, Japan), poet
Julie Otsuka (b. 1962, United States), nv.
Katrin Ottarsdóttir (b. 1957, Faroe Islands), poet & film director
Elise Otté (1818–1903, Denmark/England), grammarian
Louise Otto-Peters (1819–1895, Germany), nv., poet & librettist
Annette Jocelyn Otway-Ruthven (1909–1989, Ireland), historian & academic
Malika Oufkir (b. 1953, Morocco), prison autobiographer
Ouida (1839–1908, England), fiction wr.
Touria Oulehri (living, Morocco), critic & nv.
Eleni Ourani (1896–1971, Greece), theater critic
Clementina Díaz y de Ovando (1916–2012, Mexico), arts wr. & academic
Helen Ovbiagele (b. 1944, Nigeria), nv.
Angelika Overath (b. 1957, Germany), fiction and non-f. wr.
Caroline Overington (b. 1970, Australia), wr.
Mercy Adoma Owusu-Nimoh (1936–2011, Ghana/Gold Coast), ch. wr. & politician
Jan Owen (b. 1940, Australia), poet
Sue Owen (b. 1942, United States), poet
Olivia Owenson, Lady Clarke (1785–1845, Ireland), poet & pw.
Yvonne Adhiambo Owuor (b. 1968, Kenya), fiction wr.
Hiroko Oyamada (大伴坂上郎女, b. 1983, Japan), fiction wr.
Helen Oyeyemi (b. 1984, England/Czechoslovakia/Czech Republic), fiction wr.
Aysel Özakın (living, Turkey/Ottoman Empire/England), fiction & ch. wr.
Mari Ozawa (小沢真理, living, Japan), manga creator
Emine Sevgi Özdamar (b. 1956, Turkey/Ottoman Empire/Germany), nv. & pw. in German
Ruth Ozeki (b. 1956, United States/Canada/Newfoundland), nv. & academic
Cynthia Ozick (b. 1928, United States), critic & nv.
Tezer Özlü (1943–1986, Turkey/Ottoman Empire), wr.
Hanna Ożogowska (1904–1995, Poland), nv. & poet
Mona Ozouf (b. 1931, France), historian & philosopher

P

Pa–Pj
Henriette Paalzow (1788–1847, Germany), nv.
Julia Tuñón Pablos (b. 1948, Mexico), historian and social wr.
Joy Packer (1905–1977, South Africa), nv. and autobiographer in English
Ruth Padel (b. 1946, England), poet, critic and naturalist
Manjula Padmanabhan (b. 1953, India), pw. and ch. wr.
Elvira Pagã (1920–2003, Brazil), wr. and actor
Isabel Pagan (c. 1740–1821, Scotland), poet
Susana Pagano (b. 1968, Mexico), fiction wr.
Gertrude Page (1872–1922, England/Zimbabwe), fiction wr.
Karen A. Page (b. 1962, United States), food wr.
Elaine Pagels (b. 1943, United States), religious historian and wr.
Camille Paglia (b. 1947, United States), es.
Pagu, 1910–1962, Brazil), wr., poet and pw.
Alina Paim (1919–2011, Brazil), fiction and ch. wr.
Charlotte Painter (b. 1926, United States), nv. and wr.
Pavlina Pajk (1854–1901, Italy/Austria/Austria-Hungary), poet, nv. and es. in Slovenian
Imbi Paju (b. 1959, Estonia/Finland), wr. and filmmaker
Pak Hwasong (박화성, 1904–1988, Korea), fiction wr. and es.
Pak Kyongni (박경리, 1926–2008, Korea), nv.
Agustina Palacio de Libarona (1825–1880, Argentina), non-f. wr., storyteller, heroine
Angela Palacious (b. 1953, Bahamas), Christian wr. and minister
Maria Palaiologina, Queen of Serbia (c. 1300–1355, Serbia), wr.
Milkana G. Palavurova (b. 1974, Bulgaria), wr. on yoga and health
Marina Palei (b. 1955, Soviet Union/Netherlands), fiction wr.
Grace Paley (1922–2007, United States), fiction wr., poet and activist
Angeliki Palli (1798–1875, Italy), fiction wr., pw. and poet
Angélica Palma (1878–1935, Peru), wr. and biographer
Connie Palmen (b. 1955, Netherlands), nv.
Àngels Cardona Palmer (b. 1951, Spain), poet and activist
Fanny Purdy Palmer (1839–1923, United States), wr., poet, lecturer and activist
Helen Palmer (1917–1979, Australia), educator and historian
Nettie Palmer (1885–1964, Australia), poet, es. and critic
Kirsti Paltto (b. 1947, Finland), pw., fiction and ch. wr. in N. Sámi
Laksmi Pamuntjak (b. 1971, Indonesia), poet, nv. and food wr.
Lynn Pan (潘翎, b. 1945, China/England), non-f. wr.
Avdotya Panaeva (1820–1893, Russia), fiction wr. and mem.
Melissa Panarello (b. 1985, Italy), nv.
Katherine Pancol (b. 1954, France), nv.
Mrinal Pande (b. 1946, India), broadcaster and fiction wr.
Deanne Pandey (b. 1968, India), fitness wr.
Emmeline Pankhurst (1858–1928, England), activist and autobiographer
Sylvia Pankhurst (1882–1960, England), suffragist and poet
Vera Panova (1905–1973, Soviet Union), nv. and pw.
Meghna Pant (living, India), fiction wr.
Yolanda Pantin (born 1954, Venezuela), poet & ch. wr.
Cristina Pantoja-Hidalgo (b. 1944, Philippines), wr. and critic
Katina Papa (1903–1959, Greece), poet and nv.
Hortensia Papadat-Bengescu (1876–1955, Romania), nv.
Makereti Papakura (1873–1930, New Zealand), guidebook wr.
Maria Papayanni (b. 1964, Greece), ch. and YA wr.
Bertha Pappenheim (1859–1936, Austria/Austria-Hungary), fiction and ch. wr., pw. and poet
Intan Paramaditha (living, Indonesia), wr. and academic
Loreto Paras-Sulit (1908–2008, Philippines), fiction wr. in English
Julia Pardoe (1804–1862, England), poet and nv.
Gladys Parentelli (b. 1935, Uruguay), theologian
Sara Paretsky (b. 1947, United States), nv.
Aşıq Pəri (Ashiq Peri, c. 1811 – c. 1847, Azerbaijan), lyric poet
Susan Parisi (b. 1958, Canada/Newfoundland/Australia), horror fiction wr.
Paula Parisot (b. 1978, Brazil), wr. and illustrator
Eeva Park (b. 1950, Estonia), poet and fiction wr.
Ruth Park (1917–2010, New Zealand/Australia), nv. and ch. wr.
Park Wan-suh (박완서, 1931–2011, Korea), fiction wr.
Barbara Parker (1947–2009, United States), nv.
Catherine Langloh Parker (c. 1855–1940, Australia), fiction wr. and folklorist
Dorothy Parker (1893–1967, United States), poet, critic and fiction wr.
Jane Marsh Parker (1836–1913, United States), wr. and nv.
Pat Parker (1944–1989, United States), poet and activist
Una-Mary Parker (1930–2019, England), nv.
Molly Parkin (b. 1932, Wales), nv. and painter
Amy Parkinson (1855–1938, Canada), poet
Siobhán Parkinson (b. 1954, Ireland), ch. wr.
Adele Parks (b. 1969, England), fiction wr.
Suzan-Lori Parks (b. 1964, United States), pw. and screenwriter
Peggy Parnass (b. 1927, Germany/Sweden), fiction and non-f. wr. and actor
Fanny Parnell (1848–1882, Ireland), poet and nationalist
Sophia Parnok (1885–1933, Russia/Soviet Union), poet
Catherine Parr (1512–1548, England), Queen Consort
Valeria Parrella (b. 1974, Italy), fiction wr. and pw.
Anne Parrish (1888–1957, United States), ch. nv.
Anne Spencer Parry (1931–1985, Australia), fantasy wr.
Lorae Parry (b. 1955, Australia/New Zealand), pw. and actor
Sarah Winifred Parry (1870–1953, Wales), fiction wr.
Amy Parry-Williams (1910–1988, Wales), wr. and singer
Mona Parsa (b. 1982, United States), wr.
Shahrnush Parsipur (b. 1946, Iran/Persia), fiction and ch. wr.
Eliza Parsons (1739–1811, England), nv.
Julie Parsons (b. 1951, New Zealand), crime wr.
Alicia Partnoy (b. 1955, Argentina), poet, translator and activist
Sarah Willis Parton (1811–1872, United States), nv., col. and ch. wr.
Mrs F. C. Patrick (fl. 18th century, Ireland), nv.
S. A. Partridge (b. 1982, South Africa), YA writer in English
Vesna Parun (1922–2010, Yugoslavia/Croatia), poet
Magdalena Parys (b. 1971, Poland/Germany), wr.
Jacqueline Pascarl (b. 1963, Australia), mem. and rights advocate
Atena Pashko (1931–2012), Ukrainian chemical engineer, poet, social activist 
Nicoletta Pasquale (fl. 1540, Italy), poet
Josefina Passadori (1900–1987, Argentina), wr. and educator
Ann Patchett (b. 1963, United States), nv.
Dhiruben Patel (b. 1926, India), nv. and pw.
Shailja Patel (living, Kenya), poet and pw.
Elena Patron (living, Philippines), nv., poet and scriptwriter
Jenny Pattrick (b. 1936, New Zealand), nv.
Polly Pattullo (living, England), author, journalist, editor and publisher
Evelyn Patuawa-Nathan (living, New Zealand), wr.
Helena Patursson (1864–1916, Faroe Islands), wr., pw. and feminist
Ève Paul-Margueritte (1885–1971, France), nv. & translator
Lucie Paul-Margueritte (1886–1955, France), nov. non-f. wr., plays & translator
Hertha Pauli (1906–1973, Austria/Austria-Hungary/United States), ch. and non-f. wr. in German and English
Irene Levine Paull (1908–1981, United States), wr. and labor activist
Dora Pavel (b. 1946, Romania), fiction wr. and poet
Laura Pavel (b. 1968, Romania), es. and critic
Karolina Pavlova (1807–1893, Russia), poet and nv.
Vera Pavlova (b. 1963, Soviet Union/Russia), poet
Milena Pavlović-Barili (1909–1945, Serbia), poet
Maria Pawlikowska-Jasnorzewska (1891–1945, Poland), poet and pw.
Halina Pawlowská (b. 1955), pw. and fiction wr.
Patricia Payne (living, Australia), screenwriter
Marcela Paz (1902–1985, Chile), ch. wr.
Olena Pchilka (1849–1930, Russia/Ukraine), poet and pw.
Isabel Peacocke (1881–1973, New Zealand), nv. and broadcaster
Philippa Pearce (1920–2006, England), ch. wr.
Sharrona Pearl (b. 1977), Canadian-American historian
Edith Pearlman (1936–2023, United States), fiction and non-f. wr.
Mabel Cosgrove Wodehouse Pearse (b. 1872, death unknown), nv. and criminal
Allison Pearson (b. 1960, Wales), col. and nv.
Amparo Cabanes Pecourt (b. 1938, Spain), historian
Laura Pedersen (b. 1965, United States), wr., humorist and pw.
Ethel Pedley (1859–1898, Australia), wr. and musician
Erica Pedretti (1930–2022, Czechoslovakia/Czech Republic/Switzerland), wr. in German
Inês Pedrosa (b. 1962, Portugal), fiction wr. and pw.
Margaret Bloodgood Peeke (1838–1908, United States), traveler, lecturer, wr.
Janet Peery (b. 1948, United States), fiction wr.
Amelia Blossom Pegram (1935–2022, South Africa), wr. and performer in English
Annette Pehnt (b. 1967, Germany), academic wr. and critic
Madeleine Pelletier (1874–1939, France), activist and physician
Margarita Peña (1937–2018, Mexico), non-f. wr. and educator
Margaret Pender (1848–1920, Ireland), poet and fiction wr.
Eila Pennanen (1916–1994, Finland), nv., es. and pw.
Anne Penny (1729–1784, Wales), poet
Louise Penny (b. 1958, Canada/Newfoundland), nv.
Ethel Penrose (1857–1938, Ireland), ch. wr.
Emily Pepys (1833–1877, England), child diarist
Mariana Percovich (b. 1963, Uruguay), pw. and educator
Jennifer Percy (living, United States), wr.
Jeanne Perego (b. 1958, Italy), ch. writer and biographer
Ana Teresa Pereira (b. 1958, Portugal), nv.
Charmaine Pereira (living, Nigeria), non-f. wr.
Carina Perelli (b. 1957, Uruguay), political wr.
Ana Mercedes Perez (1910–1994, Venezuela), poet, wr. and translator
Eva Díaz Pérez (b. 1971, Spain), nv.
Julia Pérez Montes de Oca (1839–1875, Cuba), poet
Narcisa Pérez Reoyo (1849–1876, Spain), writer
Emily Perkins (b. 1970, New Zealand), fiction wr.
Sarah Maria Clinton Perkins (1824–1905, United States), ch. wr., social reformer, minister
Mary Elizabeth Perley (1863–?, United States), educator, wr.
Olga Perovskaya (1902–1961, Soviet Union), ch. wr.
Perpetua (died AD 203, Ancient Rome), prison diarist in Latin
Amelia Perrier (1841–1875, Ireland), nv. and travel wr.
Kayla Perrin (b. c. 1970), nv. and ch. wr.
Alice Perry (1885–1969, Ireland), poet and engineer
Carlotta Perry (1839/1848–1914, United States), wr. and poet
Grace Perry (1927–1987, Australia), poet and editor
Ingrid Persaud (living, Trinidad/England), fiction wr.
Lakshmi Persaud (living, Trinidad/UK), nv.
Margarita Perveņecka (b. 1976, Latvia), pw. and prose wr.
Marisha Pessl (b. 1977, United States), YA nv.
Meher Pestonji (b. 1946, India), nv., col. and social worker
Julia Peterkin (1880–1961, United States), fiction wr.
Alice E. Heckler Peters (1845–1921, United States), non-f. wr. and poet
Elizabeth Peters (1927–2013, United States), nv.
Ellis Peters (1913–1995, Wales/England), mystery wr. and translator
Marie Petersen (1816–1859, Germany), story wr.
Magdalena Petit (1903–1968, Chile), nv. and es.
Gabrielė Petkevičaitė-Bitė (1861–1943, Lithuania), fiction wr. and diarist
Marta Petreu (b. 1955, Romania), philosopher, critic and poet
Sandra Petrignani (b. 1952, Italy), fiction wr.
Kata Szidónia Petrőczy (1659–1708, Hungary), wr. and poet
Marine Petrossian (b. 1960, Armenia), poet, es. and col.
Maria Petrovykh (1908–1979, Russia/Soviet Union), poet
Lyudmila Petrushevskaya (b. 1938, Soviet Union/Russia), wr. and pw.
Ann Petry (1908–1997, United States), fiction wr. and col.
Aline Pettersson (b. 1938, Mexico), nv. and poet
Dianne Ruth Pettis (1955–2008, New Zealand), fiction wr. and poet
Sophie Petzal (b. 1990, England), screenwriter
Georges de Peyrebrune (1841–1917, France), nv.
Giulietta Pezzi (1810–1878, Italy), poet, nv. and pw.
Ida Laura Pfeiffer (1797–1858, Austria/Austria-Hungary), travel wr.
Hoa Pham (living, Australia), fiction and ch. wr.
Anna Augusta Von Helmholtz-Phelan (1890–1964, United States), professor, non-f. wr. and poet
Nancy Phelan (1913–2008, Australia), nv. and travel wr.
M. Nourbese Philip (b. 1947, Canada/Newfoundland), poet, wr. and pw.
Monique Philippart (b. 1955, Luxembourg), ch. wr. in German
Katherine Philips (1631–1664, England), poet
Angela Phillips (living, England), journalist and academic
April Phillips (living, England/New Zealand), pw. and actor
Eluned Phillips (1914–2009, Wales), bard and mem.
Esther Phillips (b. 1950, Barbados), poet
Jayne Anne Phillips (b. 1952, United States), fiction wr.
J. J. Phillips (b. 1944, United States), poet, nv. and activist
Joan Phipson (1912–2003, Australia), ch. wr.
Savitribai Phule (1831–1897, India), poet and educator
Phintys (or Phyntis, 4th or 3rd century BC, Ancient Greece), philosopher
Ife Piankhi (living, Uganda/England), poet, singer and educator
Hester Sigerson Piatt (1870–1939, Ireland), poet and col.
Costanza d'Avalos Piccolomini (died 1560, Italy), poet
Karoline Pichler (1769–1843, Austria/Austria-Hungary), nv.
Hella Pick (b. 1929, Austria/Austria-Hungary/England), non-f. wr. in English
Jodi Picoult (b. 1966, United States), nv.
Phyllis Piddington (1910–2001, Australia), fiction wr. and poet
Mariyka Pidhiryanka (1881–1963, Russia/Ukraine), poet and ch. wr.
Antoinette Pienaar (b. 1961, South Africa), writer in Afrikaans on folk medicine
Meredith Ann Pierce (b. 1958, United States), fantasy wr.
Nicola Pierce (living, Ireland), nv.
Tamora Pierce (b. 1954, United States), ch. nv.
Marge Piercy (b. 1936, United States), poet, nv. and activist
Leonie Pihama (living, New Zealand), Māori academic
Rosamunde Pilcher (1924–2019, England), romance wr.
Laetitia Pilkington (c. 1709–1750, Ireland), poet
Mary Pilkington (1761–1839, England), nv., ch. wr. and poet
Careen Pilo (fl. 2010s), Cameroonian writer and diplomat
Eleonora Fonseca Pimentel (1752–1799, Italy), poet
Florencia del Pinar (15th century, Spain), poet
Tillie S. Pine (1896–1999, Poland/United States), ch. wr.
Winsome Pinnock (b. 1961, England), pw.
Nélida Piñon (1937–2022, Brazil), nv.
Clara Pinto-Correia (b. 1960, Portugal), nv. and educator
Gita Piramal (b. 1954, India), business wr.
Zoya Pirzad (b. 1952, Iran/Persia), nv.
Hortensia Blanch Pita (1914–2004, Cuba/Mexico), historian
Juana Rosa Pita (b. 1939, Cuba/United States), poet
Bridget Pitt (living, Zimbabwe/South Africa), poet and fiction and non-f. wr. in English
Marie E. J. Pitt (1869–1948, Australia), poet
Ruth Pitter (1897–1992, England), poet
Fernanda Pivano (1917–2009, Italy), wr.
Mary Pix (1666–1709, England), nv. and pw.
Christine de Pizan (1364–1430, Italy), poet and rhetorician in French
Alejandra Pizarnik (1936–1972, Argentina), poet
Christine de Pizan (1364–c. 1430, Italy), poet and advisor
Marjorie Pizer (1920–2016, Australia), poet
Helgi Pjeturss (1872–1949, Iceland), geologist and philosopher

Pk–Py
Tamri Pkhakadze (b. 1957, Georgia (Caucasus)), nv. & ch. wr.
Josefina Pla (1903–1999, Spain/Paraguay), poet, pw. & painter
Ana Plácido (1831–1895, Portugal), nv. & autobiographer
Sylvia Plath (1932–1963, United States), poet, fiction wr. & es.
Ann Plato (c. 1820–?, United States), es.
Karen Platt (fl. 2004–present, England), garden wr.
Polly Platt (1927–2008, United States), wr. on France
Agneta Pleijel (b. 1940, Sweden), nv., poet & pw.
Louise von Plessen (1725–1799, Austria/Austria-Hungary/Denmark), mem. & royal lady in waiting
Anne Plichota (b. 1968, France), ch. wr.
Luise von Ploennies (1803–1872, Germany), poet
Vivienne Plumb (b. 1955, Australia/New Zealand), poet, pw. & fiction wr.
Amélie Plume (b. 1943, Switzerland), nv. in French
Anne Plumptre (1760–1818, England), fiction & political wr.
Sophie Podolski (1953–1974, Belgium), poet in French
Karla Poewe (b. 1941, Germany), anthropologist and historian
Maria Pognon (1844–1925, France), col. and activist
Aliénor de Poitiers (1444/1446–1509, France), wr. on etiquette
Elizabeth Polack (fl. 1830–1838, England), pw.
Gillian Polack (b. 1961, Australia), fiction wr. & editor
Marguerite Poland (b. 1950, South Africa), linguist & ch. wr. in English
Susan Polgar (b. 1969, Hungary/United States), chess wr. & grandmaster
Anna Politkovskaya (1958–2006, Soviet Union/Russia), political wr.
Leonora Polkinghorne (1873–1953, Australia), wr. & activist
Rachel Pollack (b. 1945, United States), non-f & nv. wr.
Madeleine A. Polland (1918–2005, Ireland), ch. wr.
Velma Pollard (b. 1937, Japan), poet & fiction wr.
Amalia Polleri (1909–1996, Uruguay), poet & critic
Sarah Polley (b. 1979, Canada/Newfoundland), screenwriter & activist
Katha Pollitt (b. 1948, United States), feminist poet, es. & critic
Elizaveta Polonskaya (1890–1969, Russia/Soviet Union), poet & col.
Maria Polydouri (1902–1930, Greece), poet
Elena Poniatowska (b. 1932, France/Mexico), fiction & non-f. wr.
Hana Ponická (1922–2007, Czechoslovakia/Czech Republic/Pv), political wr.
Hannah Azieb Pool (b. 1974, England/Eritrea), wr. & col.
Ida Margaret Graves Poore (1859–1941, Ireland/England), autobiographer & poet
Gudibande Poornima (living, India), poet & nv.
Olúmìdé Pópóọlá (living, Nigeria/Germany), poet & nv.
Elizabeth Polwheele (1651 – c. 1691, England), pw.
Elena Poniatowska (b. 1932, Poland/Mexico), fiction wr. & col.
Marie Ponsot (1921–2019, United States), poet & es.
Elsa Pooley (b. 1947, South Africa), botanical wr. in English
Cora Scott Pond Pope (1856–?, United States), pageant wr., activist
Elena Pop-Hossu-Longin (1862–1940, Austria/Austria-Hungary/Romania), non-f. wr. & activist
Maria Popova (b. 1984, Bulgaria/United States), critic
Adelheid Popp (1869–1939, Austria/Austria-Hungary), feminist wr. & autobiographer
Azalais de Porcairagues (late 12th century, France), poet in Occitan
Alicia Porro (1908–1983, Uruguay), poet & musician
Alice Hobbins Porter (1854–1926, England/United States), journalist & wr.
Anna Maria Porter (1780–1832, England), poet & nv.
Delia Lyman Porter (1858–1933, United States), wr.
Dorothy Featherstone Porter (1954–2008, Australia), poet
Eleanor H. Porter (1868–1920, United States), ch. wr.; Pollyanna
Jane Porter (1776–1850, England), nv. & pw.
Katherine Anne Porter (1890–1980, United States), col. & nv.
Marie Porter (b. 1939), wr. & welfare advocate
Renada-Laura Portet (1927-2021, France) wr. & linguist
Margarita López Portillo (1914–2006, Mexico), nv.
Ethel Portnoy (1927–2004, United States/Netherlands), nv. in English
Suzanne Portnoy (b. 1961, England), wr. & pw.
Teresa Porzecanski (b. 1945, Uruguay), fiction wr. & anthropologist
Dina Posada (b. 1946, Somalia/Guatemala), poet
Carmen Posadas (b. 1963, Uruguay/Spain), ch. wr.
Francesca Bortolotto Possati (living, Italy), wr.
Birgitte Possing (b. 1952, Denmark), historian & biographer
Emily Post (1873–1960, United States), nv.
Sue-Ann Post (b. 1964, Australia), comedian & wr.
Halina Poświatowska (1935–1967, Poland), poet & correspondent
Beatrix Potter (1866–1943, England), ch. wr. & illustrator; The Tale of Peter Rabbit
Anna M. Longshore Potts (1829–1912, United States), non-f. wr.
Alice Poulleau (1885–1960, France), geographer, historian & poet
Kira Poutanen (b. 1974, Finland/France), nv. & actor
Helvi Poutasuo (1914–2017, Finland), academic & wr. in Sámi
Dawn Powell (1896–1965, United States), fiction wr. & pw.
Patricia Powell (b. 1966, Jamaica), nv.
Sarah Powell (1922–1941, France), poet
Sidney Powell, attorney, non-f. wr.
Eileen Power (1889–1940, England), economic historian & medievalist
Máire Wyse Power (1887–1916, Ireland), Celtic scholar
Marguerite Agnes Power (1815–1867, Ireland/England), nv. & commentator
Rhoda Power (1890–1957, England), educational & ch. wr.
Eve Pownall (1901–1982, Australia), ch. wr. & historian
Luz Pozo Garza (1922–2020, Spanish), poet
Antonia Pozzi (1912–1938, Italy), poet
Manjiri Prabhu (b. 1964, India), pw. & TV producer
Núria Pradas (born 1954, Spain), philologist & wr.
Manasi Pradhan (b. 1962, India), poet, writer & activist
Adélia Prado (b. 1935, Brazil), wr. & poet
Rosa Praed (Mrs Campbell Praed, 1851–1935, Australia), nv.
Katharina Prato (1818–1897, Austria/Austria-Hungary), cookery wr.
Sofiya Pregel (1894–1972, Russia/France), poet
Stefanie Preissner (b. 1988, Ireland), poet & pw.
Gabriela Preissová (1862–1946, Austria/Austria-Hungary/Czechoslovakia/Czech Republic), pw. & fiction wr.
Paula von Preradović (1887–1951, Austria/Austria-Hungary), story wr. & poet
Karen Press (b. 1956, South Africa), poet in English
Jewel Prestage (1931–2014, United States), political scientist
Angharad Price (living, Wales), nv. & academic
Evadne Price (1888–1985, Australia), wr.
Katharine Susannah Prichard (1883–1969, Australia), fiction wr. & pw.
Rebecca Priestley (living, New Zealand), science historian & academic
Maria Prilezhayeva (1903–1989, Russia/Soviet Union), ch. wr. & critic
Diane di Prima (1934–2020, United States), poet
Althea Prince (b. 1945, Antigua/Canada/Newfoundland), wr., editor & professor
Mary Prince (c. 1788 – post-1833, Bermuda), autobiographer
Pauline Prior-Pitt (living, Scotland), poet
Amrita Pritam (1919–2005, India), poet, nv. & es.
Nalini Priyadarshni (living, India), poet & wr.
Faltonia Betitia Proba (c. 306/315 – c. 353/366, Ancient Rome), poet in Latin
May Probyn (1856–1909, England), poet
Lenka Procházková (b. 1951, Czechoslovakia/Czech Republic), nv. & radio pw.
Adelaide Anne Procter (1825–1864, England), poet
Elaine Proctor (b. 1960, South Africa), screenwriter & nv. in English
Lilli Promet (1922–2007, Estonia), nv. & es.
Francine Prose (b. 1947, United States), fiction & non-f. wr. & critic
Anne Provoost (b. 1964, Belgium), YA fiction wr. in French
Annie Proulx (b. 1935, United States), fiction wr. & col.
Florence Prusmack (1920–2013, United States), nv.
Myfanwy Pryce (1890–1976, England), fiction wr.
Stanisława Przybyszewska (1901–1935, Austria/Austria-Hungary/Poland), pw.
Sofija Pšibiliauskienė (1867–1926, Lithuania), fiction wr.
Lucía Puenzo (b. 1976, Argentina), nv. & film director
María Luisa Puga (1944–2004, Mexico), fiction & ch. wr.
Esther Pugh (1834–1908, United States), editor
Sheenagh Pugh (b. 1950, Wales), poet & nv.
Alenka Puhar (b. 1945, Yugoslavia/Slovenia), social historian
Marina Šur Puhlovski (living, Croatia), nv. & es.
Carmen Montoriol Puig (1893–1966, Spain), poet, wr. & pw.
Odette du Puigaudeau (1894–1991, France), traveler & wr.
Adriana Puiggrós (b. 1941, Argentina), non-f. wr. & educator
Erenora Puketapu-Hetet (1941–2006, New Zealand), wr. & weaver
Rufina Pukhova (1932–2021, Soviet Union/Russia), mem.
Paulina Pukytė (b. 1966, Lithuania), poet, critic & artist
Antonia Tanini Pulci (1452/1454–1501, Italy), pw.
Elizabeth Pulford (b. 1943, Canada/Newfoundland/New Zealand), ch., YA, fiction & non-f. wr. & poet
Riikka Pulkkinen (b. 1980, Finland), nv.
Benka Pulko (b. 1967, Yugoslavia/Slovenia), travel wr.
Theresa Pulszky (1819–1866, Austria), historical and travel wr.
Alice Pung (b. 1981, Australia), nv., mem. & lawyer
Deirdre Purcell (b. 1945, Ireland), nv. & biographer
Katherine Purdon (1852–1920, Ireland), nv. & pw.
Neel Kamal Puri (b. 1956, India), fiction wr. & educator
Jennie Phelps Purvis (1831–1924, United States), wr., suffragist, reformer
Luise F. Pusch (b. 1944, Germany), academic linguist
Fanny Puyesky (1939–2010, Uruguay), social wr.
Barbara Pym (1913–1980, England), nv.
Helen Pyne-Timothy (1937–2015, Jamaica), critic & academic
Maria Pypelinckx (1538–1608, Flanders/Germany), correspondent in Flemish
Svitlana Pyrkalo (b. 1976, Ukraine/England), nv. & es.

Q

Najwa Qassem (1967–2020, Lebanon), col. & broadcaster
Li Qingzhao (李清照, 1084 – c. 1155 or 1081 – c. 1141, China), poet
Qiu Jin (秋瑾, 1875–1907, China), revolutionary & feminist wr.
Marjorie Quarton (b. 1930, Ireland), ch. wr. & nv.
Ada Quayle (1920–2002, Jamaica), nv.
Daisy May Queen (b. 1965, Argentina)
Diná Silveira de Queirós (1911–1982, Brazil)
Rachel de Queiroz (1910–2003, Brazil)
Catharina Questiers (1631–1669, Netherlands), poet & pw.
Alison Quigan (fl. 1980s, New Zealand), pw. & actor
Betty Quin (died 1993, Australia), scriptwriter
Anna Quindlen (b. 1953, United States), nv. & col.
Rebeca Quintáns (b. 1964, Spain), research wr.
Elena Quiroga (1921–1995, Spain), nv.
Christine Qunta (b. 1952, South Africa), poet & social wr. in English
Anne Margrethe Qvitzow (1652–1700, Denmark), poet, translator & mem.

R

Ra–Ri
Ra Heeduk (나희덕, b. 1966, Korea), poet
Marie de Rabutin-Chantal, marquise de Sévigné (1626–1696, France), correspondent
Rachilde (1860–1953, France), nv. & pw.
Ann Radcliffe (1764–1823, England), nv.; The Mysteries of Udolpho
Radegund (c. 520–586, France), princess/poet in Latin
Thérèse Radic (b. 1935, Australia), pw. & musicologist
Valentina Dimitrova Radinska (b. 1951, Bulgaria), poet
Giedra Radvilavičiūtė (b. 1960, Lithuania), fiction wr.
Undinė Radzevičiūtė (b. 1967, Lithuania), fiction wr.
Gwynedd Rae (1892–1977, Wales), ch. wr.
Janet Milne Rae (1844–1933, Scotland), fiction wr.
Sophie Raffalovich (1860–1960, Ireland), nv.
Nigar Rafibeyli (1913–1981, Azerbaijan), poet
Orlaith Rafter (living, Ireland), pw. & nv.
Mary Raftery (1957–2012, Ireland), wr. & filmmaker
Marimo Ragawa (羅川真里茂, living, Japan), manga creator
Jennifer Rahim (b. 1963, Trinidad), educator & wr.
Bushra Rahman (1944–2022), Pakistan), nv. & politician
Rizia Rahman (1939–2019, India/Bangladesh), fiction wr.
Allen Raine (1836–1908, Wales), nv.
Maggie Rainey-Smith (b. 1950, New Zealand), fiction wr., es. & poet
Rita Rait-Kovaleva (1898–1989, Russia/Soviet Union), wr. & translator
Samina Raja (1961–2012, Pakistan), poet, wr. & broadcaster
Rajalakshmi (1930–1965, India), fiction wr. & poet
Rajashree (living, India), nv.
Maraea Rakuraku (living, New Zealand), pw.
Hilda Ram (1858–1901, Belgium), poet & librettist in Flemish
Anuradha Ramanan (1947–2010, India), fiction wr. & activist
Ramanichandran (b. 1938, India), nv.
Hanna Rambe (b. 1940, Indonesia), fiction wr. & biographer
María Abella de Ramírez (1863–1926, Uruguay), feminist wr.
Fabrizia Ramondino (1936–2008, Italy), fiction wr., poet & mem.
Adele Ramos (living, Belize), poet & wr.
Consuelo González Ramos (1977 – unknown death year, Spain), nursing wr.
Karolina Ramqvist (b. 1976, Sweden), fiction wr.
Ayn Rand (1905–1982, Russia/United States), nv. & philosopher
Charlotte Randall (living, New Zealand), nv.
Marta Randall (b. 1948, Mexico/United States), science fiction wr.
Beverley Randell (b. 1931, New Zealand), ch. wr.
Jo Randerson (b. 1973, New Zealand), pw. & fiction wr.
Ravinder Randhawa (b. 1952, India/England), fiction wr.
Mary Randolph (1762–1828, United States), domestic wr.
Jennifer Rankin (1941–1979, Australia), poet & pw.
Claudia Rankine (b. 1963, United States), poet & pw.
Bhargavi Rao (1944–2008, India), fiction wr. & poet
Malathi Rao (b. 1930, India), nv.
Rao Xueman (饒雪漫, b. 1972, China), fiction wr.,
Ágnes Rapai (b. 1952, Hungary), poet & wr.
Eva Ras (b. 1941, Serbia), poet & fiction wr.
Fawziya Rashid (b. 1954, Bahrain), fiction wr.
Lea Ráskay (early 16th century, Hungary), scholar & nun
Ellen Raskin (1928–1984, United States), ch. wr. & illustrator
Maria Rasputin (1898–1987, Russia/Soviet Union), mem.
Patricia Ratto (b. 1962, Argentina), wr.
Irina Ratushinskaya (1954–2017, Soviet Union/Russia), poet & fiction wr.
Santha Rama Rau (1923–2009, India/United States), fiction & non-f. wr.
Elsa Rautee (1897–1987, Finland), poet
Lidia Ravera (b. 1951, Italy), nv., es. & screenwriter
Dahlia Ravikovitch (1936–2005, Israel), poet & activist
Olga Ravn (b. 1986, Denmark), poet & nv.
Angela Rawlings (b. 1978, Canada/Newfoundland), poet, editor & artist
Marjorie Kinnan Rawlings (1896–1953, United States), nv.
Gloria Rawlinson (1918–1995, New Zealand), poet & fiction wr.
Sarah Rayner (living, England), wr. & copywr.
Helen Raynor (b. 1972, Wales), scriptwriter
Angela Readman (b. 1973, England), poet
Pauline Réage (1907–1998, France), nv.
Grisélidis Réal (1929–2005, Switzerland), wr. on prostitution in French
Elizabeth Reapy (living, Ir), fiction wr.
Anica Savić Rebac (1892–1953, Serbia), es., biographer & translator
Elisa von der Recke (1754–1833, Germany), Courland wr. & poet in German
Jaclyn Reding (b. 1966, United States), nv.
Marie Redonnet (b. 1948, France), poet, nv. & pw.
Beatrice Redpath (1886–1937, Canada), poet & short story wr. 
Kerry Reed-Gilbert (1956–2019, Australia), poet & wr.
Märta Helena Reenstierna (1753–1841, Sweden), diarist
Annie Lee Rees (1864–1949, Australia/New Zealand), wr.
Rosemary Frances Rees (c. 1875–1963, New Zealand/England), pw., nv. & actor
Sarah Jane Rees (1839–1916, Wales), poet & teacher
Clara Reeve (1729–1807, England), nv.
Amber Reeves (1887–1981, New Zealand), wr. & scholar
Nell Regan (b. 1969, Ireland), poet & non-f. wr.
Elisabeth Reichart (b. 1953, Austria/Austria-Hungary), fiction wr. & pw.
Ruth Reichl (b. 1948, United States), food wr. & mem.
Eva Gabriele Reichmann (1897–1998, Germany), historian & sociologist
Christina Reid (1942–2015, Ireland), pw.
Gayla Reid (b. 1945, Australia/Canada/Newfoundland), nv.
Kiley Reid (b. 1987, United States), nv.
Sue Reidy (living, New Zealand), fiction wr.
Brigitte Reimann (1933–1973, Germany), nv.
Mercedes Rein (1930–2006, Uruguay), critic & pw.
Lenka Reinerová (1916–2008, Czechoslovakia/Czech Republic), nv. in German
Emma May Alexander Reinertsen (1853–1920, United States), wr.
Annemarie Reinhard (1921–1976, Germany), nv. & ch. wr.
Christa Reinig (1926–2008, Germany), poet, wr. & pw.
Maria Firmina dos Reis (1825–1917, Brazil), nv. & activist
Małgorzata Rejmer (b. 1985, Poland), fiction wr.
Kati Rekai (1921–2010, Hungary/Canada/Newfoundland), ch. travel wr.
Mirkka Rekola (1931–2014, Finland), poet
Christine Renard (1929–1979, France), science fiction wr.
Veronique Renard (b. 1965, Netherlands), wr. & artist
Rosa de Eguílaz y Renart (b. 1864, death date unknown, Spain), pw.
Mary Renault (1905–1983, England), YA wr.
Ruth Rendell (1930–2015, England), nv.
Renée (b. 1929, New Zealand), pw.
Céline Renooz (1840–1928, Belgium/France), science wr. in French
Nuchhungi Renthlei (1914–2002, India), poet & educator
Lola Taborga de Requena (1890 – c. 1950, Bolivia), poet
Laura Restrepo (b. 1950, Comoros), nv. & col.
Magdalena Dobromila Rettigová (1785–1845), cookery wr.
Gabriele Reuter (1859–1941, Germany), fiction, es. & ch. wr.
Gabrielle Réval (1869–1938, France), nv. &, es.
Fanny zu Reventlow (1871–1918, Germany), political wr. & feminist
Jytte Rex (b. 1942, Denmark), wr., artist & film director
Ofelia Rey Castelao (born 1956, Spain) historian, wr., & professor
Adela Calva Reyes (1967–2018, Mexico), wr. & pw. in Otomi
Cristina Reyes (b. 1981, Ecuador), poet & politician
Soledad Reyes (b. 1946, Philippines), scholar & critic
Lorna Reynolds (1911–2003, Ireland), wr. & academic
Yasmina Reza (b. 1959, France), pw., actor & nv.
Regina Rheda (b. 1957, Brazil/United States), fiction & non-f. wr.
Fouzia Rhissassi (b. 1947, Morocco), social scientist
Najima Rhozali (b. 1960, Morocco), wr. on legends
Grace Rhys (1865–1929, Ireland), fiction wr., poet & es.
Jean Rhys (1890–1979, Dominica/England), nv.; Wide Sargasso Sea
Fahmida Riaz (1946–2018, Pakistan/India), poet & activist
Mrs. Riazuddin (b. 1928, Pakistan), feminist & travel wr.
Ana Ribeiro (b. 1955, Uruguay), nv. & historian
Esmeralda Ribeiro (b. 1958, Brazil), poet & fiction wr.
Catherine of Ricci (1522–1590, Italy), religious wr. & saint
Marie Jeanne Riccoboni (1713–1792, France), nv. and actor
Anne Rice (1941–2021, United States), nv.
Adrienne Rich (1929–2012, United States), feminist poet & es.
Jo-Anne Richards (living, South Africa), col. & wr. in English
Dorothy Richardson (1873–1957, England), fiction wr., poet & es.
Elizabeth Richardson (1576/1577–1651, England), religious wr.
Ethel Richardson (1870–1946, Australia), nv.
Hester Dorsey Richardson (1862–1933, United States), wr.
Paddy Richardson (living, New Zealand), fiction wr.
Jutta Richter (b. 1955, Germany), ch. & YA wr.
Sylvie Richterová (b. 1945, Czechoslovakia/Czech Republic/Italy), fiction wr. & es.
E. J. Richmond (1825-1918, US), nv. & ch. wr.
Jessie Louisa Rickard (1876–1963, Ireland), fiction & non-f. wr.
Elsie Alvarado de Ricord (1928–2005, Panama), linguist & academic
Charlotte Riddell (1832–1906, Iran/Persia/England), fiction wr.
Elizabeth Riddell (1910–1998, Australia), poet & col.
Maria Riddell (1772–1808, West Indies/Scotland), poet, travel wr. & naturalist
Lola Ridge (1873–1941, Australia/United States), poet & editor
Laura Riding (1901–1991, United States), poet, critic & fiction wr.
Brigitte Riebe (b. 1935, Germany), nv.
Ane Riel (b. 1971, Denmark), ch. wr.
Alifa Rifaat (1930–1996, Egypt), fiction wr.
Anna Rankin Riggs (1835–1908, United States), non-f. ed.
Catherine Rihoit (b. 1950, France), nv. & biographer
Rikei (理慶, 1530–1611, Japan), poet & calligrapher
Denise Riley (b. 1948, England), poet & philosopher
Lucinda Riley (1966–2021, Ireland), fiction wr.
Joan Riley (b. 1958, Jamaica/England), nv.
Mary Roberts Rinehart (1876–1958, United States), nv., pw. & poet
Susanne Ringell (born 1955, Finland), wr. & actor
Signe Rink (1936–2009, Denmark), wr. & ethnologist
Luise Rinser (1911–2002, Germany), nv., autobiographer & ch. wr.
Paloma del Río (b. 1960, Spain), sports wr.
Dorothy Ripley (1767–1831, England/United States), religious wr.
Mary A. Ripley (1831–1893, United States), wr.
Enriqueta Compte y Riqué (1866–1949, Uruguay), ch. wr. & educator
Anne Isabella Thackeray Ritchie (1837–1919, England), nv.
Alice Rivaz (1901–1998, Switzerland), fiction wr. & es. in French
María Jesús Alvarado Rivera (1878–1971, Peru), social activist
Giovanna Rivero (b. 1972, Bolivia), fiction wr.
Viviana Rivero (b. 1966, Argentina), wr. & nv.
Christine de Rivoyre (1921–1919, France), nv.

Ro–Rz
Marion Roach (fl. 1980s, United States), non-f. wr.
Alba Roballo (1908–1996, Uruguay), poet & politician
Nesca Robb (1905–1976, Northern Ireland), biographer & poet
Sarah Fraser Robbins (1911–2002, United States), wr. & natural historian
Antoinette Henriette Clémence Robert (1797–1872, France), nv. & pw.
Carolina de Robertis (b. 1975, England/United States), nv.
Eigra Lewis Roberts (b. 1939, Wales), pw. & nv. in Welsh
Emma Roberts (1794–1840, England), travel wr. & poet
Kate Roberts (1891–1985, Wales), fiction wr. in Welsh
Michèle Roberts (b. 1949, England), nv. & poet
Margaret Roberts (1937–2017, South Africa), wr. & herbalist in English
Nina Roberts (living, France), wr.
Nora Roberts (pen name J. D. Robb, b. 1950, United States), nv.
Catherine Robertson (b. 1966, New Zealand), nv. & broadcaster
E. Arnot Robertson (1903–1961, England), nv.
Lisa Robertson (b. 1961, Canada/Newfoundland), poet
Anne Isabella Robertson (c. 1830–1910, Ireland), nv. & suffragist
Eden Robinson (b. 1968, Canada/Newfoundland), fiction wr.
Hilary Robinson (b. 1972, Isle of Man), ch. wr.
Leora Bettison Robinson (1840–1914, United States), wr. & educator
Marilynne Robinson (b. 1943, United States), nv.
Mary Robinson (1757–1800, England), poet, nv. & actor
Kim Robinson-Walcott (b. 1956, Jamaica), poet & editor
Aïcha Mohamed Robleh (b. 1965, Djibouti), wr.
Mireya Robles (b. 1934, Cuba/United States), wr. & nv.
Lucia St. Clair Robson (living, United States), nv.
Lelia P. Roby (1848–1910, United States), wr.
Charlotte Roche (b. 1978, England/Germany), nv.
Mazo de la Roche (1885–1961, Canada/Newfoundland), nv.
Regina Maria Roche (1764–1845, Ireland), nv.
Sophie von La Roche (1730–1807, Germany), nv.
Anne de La Roche-Guilhem (1644–1707/1710, France), fiction wr.
Christiane Rochefort (1917–1998, France), nv.
Catherine Des Roches (1542–1587, France), poet
Madeleine Des Roches (c. 1520–1587, France), poet
Esther Rochon (b. 1948, Canada/Newfoundland), science fiction nv.
Ana María Rodas (b. 1937, Guatemala), col. & poet
Edith Rode (1879–1956, Denmark), nv. & col.
Carolyn Rodgers (1940–2010, United States), poet
Carmen Rodríguez (b. 1948, Chile/Canada/Newfoundland), wr., poet & activist
Debbie Rodriguez (living, United States), wr.
Fátima Rodríguez (b. 1961, Spain), wr., translator, professor
Jesusa Rodríguez (b. 1955, Mexico), stage wr.
Judith Rodriguez (1936–2018, Australia), poet
Silvia Rodríguez Villamil (1939–2003, Uruguay), historian, feminist, wr., activist
Maria Rodziewiczówna (1863–1944, Poland), political wr. & landowner
Jill Roe (1940–2017, Australia), historian, academic & wr.
Ruth Margarete Roellig (1878–1969, Germany), non-f. & travel wr.
Astrid Roemer (b. 1947, Suriname/Netherlands), nv., pw. & poet
Helena Roerich (1879–1955, Russia/Soviet Union), theosophist & mystic
Diodata Saluzzo Roero (1774–1840, Italy), poet, pw. & fiction wr.
Else Roesdahl (b. 1942, Denmark), archaeologist & historian
Monique Roffey (b. 1965, Trinidad), nv. & mem.
Rosamaría Roffiel (b. 1945, Mexico), poet & nv.
Christina Rogberg (1832–1907, Sweden), court mem.
Noëlle Roger (1874–1953, Switzerland), nv. & biographer in French
Emma Winner Rogers (1855–1922, United States) – wr., speaker, suffragist
Kathrin Röggla (b. 1971, Austria/Austria-Hungary), pw., es. & poet
Begum Rokeya (1880–1932, India), wr. & activist
Winétt de Rokha (1892–1951, Chile), poet
Betty Roland (1903–1996, Australia), stage & ch. wr. & nv.
Dominique Rolin (1913–2012, Belgium), nv. in French
Adelaide Day Rollston (1854–1941, United States), wr., nv. & poet
Eugenia Romanelli (b. 1972, Italy), nv. & biographer
Lalla Romano (1906–2001, Italy), nv. & poet
Sophia Romero (living, Philippines/United States), nv.
Emma Romeu (living, Cuba/Mexico), nature & ch. wr.
Robin Romm (living, United States), wr.
Hanna Rönnberg (1862–1946, Finland/Denmark), painter & fiction wr. in Swedish
Nathalie Ronvaux (b. 1977, Luxembourg), poet & pw. in French
Daphne Rooke (1914–2009, South Africa), fiction wr. in English
Sally Rooney (b. 1991, Ireland), fiction wr., poet & es.
Ginny Rorby (b. 1944, United States), YA nv.
Amanda McKittrick Ros (1860–1939, Iran/Persia/Northern Ireland), nv. & poet
Emanuela Da Ros (living, Italy), ch. wr.
Helvy Tiana Rosa (b. 1970, Indonesia), pw. & fiction wr.
Amira de la Rosa, (1895–1974, Colombia), col., fiction wr., poet & pw.
Ninotchka Rosca (b. 1946, Philippines), wr. & activist
Heather Rose (b. 1964, Australia), nv.
Martha Parmelee Rose (1834–1923, United States), non-f.
Henrietta Rose-Innes (b. 1971, South Africa), fiction wr. in English
Petrona Rosende (1797–1893, Argentina), poet & col.
Chava Rosenfarb (1923–2011, Poland/Canada/Newfoundland), poet, nv. & Hc. survivor
Barbara Rosiek (1959–2020, Poland), wr., poet & psychologist
Joan Rosier-Jones (b. 1940, New Zealand), fiction & non-f. wr. & pw.
Alice Grant Rosman (1887–1961, Australia), nv.
Anna Rosmus (b. 1960, Germany), historian
Tatiana de Rosnay (b. 1961, France/England), fiction wr. & biographer
Martha Parmelee Rose (1834-1923, United States), non-f. wr., journalist, social reformer
Anna Ross (1773–?, England), opera pw. & actor
Leone Ross (b. 1969, England), fiction wr. & academic
Orna Ross (b. 1960, Ireland), fiction & non-f. wr. & poet
Nancy Wilson Ross (1901–1986, United States), nv.
Somerville & Ross (Edith Somerville, 1858–1949, & Violet Florence Martin, 1862–1915, Ireland), fiction wr.s; The Irish R. M.
Mary Jane O'Donovan Rossa (1845–1916, Ireland), poet & activist
Maria Rosseels (1916–2005, Belgium), nv. in Flemish
Christina Rossetti (1830–1894, England), poet
Cristina Peri Rossi (living, Uruguay/Spain), fiction wr. & poet
Veronica Rossi (b. 1973, United States), YA nv.
Judith Rossner (1935–2005, United States), nv.
Evdokiya Rostopchina (1811–1858, Russia), poet
Stella Rotenberg (1916–2013, Austria/Austria-Hungary), poet
Friederike Roth (b. 1948, Germany), pw.
Maria Elizabeth Rothmann (1875–1975, South Africa), wr.
Veronica Roth (b. 1988, United States), nv.
Hannah Mary Rothschild (b. 1962, England), wr., philanthropist & filmmaker
Maria Elizabeth Rothmann (1875–1975, South Africa), nv. & non-f. wr. in Afrikaans
Angélique de Rouillé (1756–1840, Belgium), correspondent in French
Marie-Anne de Roumier-Robert (fl. 18th century), science fiction wr.
Anne Rouse (b. 1954 United States/England), poet
Alma Routsong (Isabel Miller, 1924–1996, United States), nv.
Léonie Rouzade (1839–1916, France), nv. and feminist
Jennifer Rowe (b. 1948, Australia), nv.
Jane Helen Rowlands (1891–1955, Wales), scholar & evangelist
Mary Rowlandson (1635–1711, United States), mem.
Rosemarie Rowley (b. 1942, Ireland), poet & feminist
J. K. Rowling (b. 1965, England/Scotland), nv.; Harry Potter
Susanna Rowson (1762–1824, England/United States), nv., poet & pw.
Hannie Rouweler (b. 1951, Netherlands), poet
Margaret Rowlett (1897–1963), children's book writer
Tania Roxborogh (b. 1965, New Zealand), fiction & parenting wr.
Susanna Roxman (1946–2015, Sweden/England), wr., poet & critic
Anuradha Roy (b. 1967, India), nv.
Anusree Roy (b. 1982, India/Canada/Newfoundland), pw. & librettist
Arundhati Roy (b. 1961, India), nv.; The God of Small Things
Gabrielle Roy (1909–1983, Canada/Newfoundland), nv. & col.
Kamini Roy (1864–1933, India), poet & feminist
Lucinda Roy (b. 1955, United States/England), nv.
Nilanjana Roy (b. c. 1971, India), fiction & food wr.
Kristína Royová (1860–1936, Austria/Austria-Hungary/Czechoslovakia/Czech Republic), nv., poet & religious wr. in Slovak
Heleen van Royen (b. 1965, Netherlands), nv.
S. J. Rozan (b. 1950, United States), crime wr.
Pascale Roze (b. 1954, Vietnam/France), pw. & nv.
Ru Zhijuan (茹志鵑, 1925–1998, China), fiction wr.
Isabel de los Ángeles Ruano (b. 1945, Guatemala), poet & writer
Bernice Rubens (1928–2004, Wales), nv.
Baņuta Rubess (b. 1956, Canada/Newfoundland), pw.
Dina Rubina (b. 1953, Soviet Union/Russia), wr.
Renate Rubinstein (1929–1990, Germany/Netherlands), wr. & col.
Berta Ruck (1878–1978, Wales), nv. & mem.
Jacqueline Rudet (b. 1962, England), pw.
Margot Ruddock (1907–1951, Ireland), poet
Anne Rudloe (1947–2012, United States), marine biologist & Buddhist
Helga Ruebsamen (1934–2016, Netherlands), wr.
Alice Rühle-Gerstel (1894–1943, Germany/Mexico), wr. and psychologist
Wanda Sieradzka de Ruig (1923–2008, Poland/Netherlands), poet & screenwriter
Julia Nava de Ruisánchez (1883–1964, Mexico), es. & col.
Muriel Rukeyser (1913–1980, United States), feminist poet
Siti Rukiah (1927–1996, Dutch East Indies/Indonesia), poet & nv.
Lupe Rumazo (b. 1933, Ecuador), fiction wr. & es.
Katherine Rundell (b. 1987, England), ch. wr. & pw.
Fredrika Runeberg (1807–1879, Finland), nv. in Swedish
Eva Runefelt (b. 1953, Sweden), nv. & poet
Kristina Rungano (b. 1963, Zimbabwe), poet & fiction wr.
Rona Rupert (1934–1995, South Africa), ch. & YA, wr. in Afrikaans
Prima Rusdi (b. 1967, Indonesia), screenwriter & arts writer
Oka Rusmini (b. 1967, Indonesia), poet & fiction & ch. wr.
Joanna Russ (1937–2011, United States), fiction wr. & es.
Diana E. H. Russell (1938–2020, South Africa/United States), feminist wr. & activist
Dora Isella Russell (1925–1990, Argentina/Uruguay) poet & journalist
Frances Theresa Peet Russell (1873–1936, United States), English literature 
Karen Russell (b. 1981, United States), fiction wr.
Doina Ruști (b. 1957, Romania), nv. & screenwriter
Rose Rwakasisi (b. 1945, Uganda), editor, fiction wr. & educator
Gig Ryan (b. 1956, Australia), poet
Kay Ryan (b. 1945, United States), poet & educator
Marah Ellis Ryan (1860–1934, United States), nv.
Nan Ryan (1936–2017, United States), nv.
Meda Ryan (living, Ireland), historian
Roma Ryan (b. 1950, Northern Ireland), poet & lyricist
Maria Rybakova (b. 1973, Soviet Union/Russia), fiction wr.
Carina Rydberg (b. 1962, Sweden), nv.
Kaisu-Mirjami Rydberg (1905–1959, Finland), wr. & politician
Elisabeth Rynell (b. 1954, Sweden), poet & nv.
Elizabeth Ryves (1750–1797, Iran/Persia/England), poet
Elena Rzhevskaya (1919–2017, Soviet Union/Russia), mem. & non-f. wr.

S

Sa–Se
Astrid Saalbach (b. 1955, Belgium), pw. & nv.
Carola Saavedra (b. 1973, Brazil), nv.
Etelvina Villanueva y Saavedra (1897–1969, Bolivia), poet & educator
Mariana de Carvajal y Saavedra (1620–1670, Spain), nv.
Kristina Sabaliauskaitė (b. 1974, Lithuania), nv. & art historian
María Herminia Sabbia y Oribe (1883-1961, Uruguay), poet
Isabel Sabogal (b. 1958, Peru), nv. & poet
Irina Saburova (1907–1979, Latvia/Germany), fiction wr. in Russian
Padma Sachdev (1940–2021, India), poet & nv.
Lessie Sachs (1897–1942, Germany/United States), poet
Nelly Sachs (1891–1970, Germany), poet & pw.; 1966 Nobel Prize in Literature
Vita Sackville-West (1892–1962, England), wr., poet & gardener
Mary Sadler (b. 1941, South Africa), nv.
Anna T. Sadlier (1854–1932, Canada), wr. & translator 
Mary Anne Sadlier (1920–2003, Iran/Persia/Canada/Newfoundland), fiction wr.
Izabela Sadoveanu-Evan (1870–1941, Romania), critic & poet
Shadi Sadr (b. 1974, Iran/Persia), es. & lawyer
Nina Mikhailovna Sadur (b. 1950, Soviet Union/Russia), fiction wr. & pw.
Elif Safak (b. 1971, Turkey/Ottoman Empire), wr.
Tahereh Saffarzadeh (1936–2008, Iran/Persia), poet & academic
Françoise Sagan (1935–2004, France), pw., nv. & screenwriter
Mamta Sagar (b. 1966, India), Kannada poet & pw.
Lorna Sage (1943–2001, England), academic, critic & author
Ana María Martínez Sagi (1907–2000, Spain/France), poet & feminist
Megumu Sagisawa (鷺沢萠, 1968–2004, Japan), nv. & pw.
Nayantara Sahgal (b. 1927, India), nv. & correspondent
Sarojini Sahoo (b. 1956, India), feminist & fiction wr.
Nandini Sahu (b. 1973, India), poet & folklorist in English
Rieko Saibara (西原理恵子, b. 1964, Japan), manga creator
Saigū no Nyōgo (斎宮女御, 929–985, Japan), poet
Amina Said (b. 1953, Tunisia/France), poet, fiction wr. & es.
Titie Said (1935–2011, Dutch East Indies/Indonesia), nv.
Fumi Saimon (柴門ふみ, b. 1957, Japan), manga creator
Stéphanie Félicité du Crest de Saint-Aubin (1746–1830, France), nv., pw. & ch. wr.
Maria de Villegas de Saint-Pierre (1870–1941, Belgium), nv. in French
Vefa de Saint-Pierre (1872–1967, France), nv., poet & explorer
Pirkko Saisio (b. 1949, Finland), wr. & actor
Mayu Sakai (酒井まゆ, b. 1982, Japan), manga creator
Widad Sakakini (1913–1991, Syria), fiction wr. & es.
Io Sakisaka (咲坂伊緒, living, Japan), manga creator
Anna Sakse (1905–1981, Latvia/Soviet Union), fiction wr.
Momoko Sakura (さくらももこ, 1965–2018, Japan), manga creator
Shino Sakuragi (桜木紫乃, b. 1965, Japan), fiction wr.
Kanoko Sakurakoji (桜小路かのこ, living, Japan), manga creator
Erica Sakurazawa (桜沢エリカ, b. 1963, Japan), manga creator
Arja Salafranca (b. 1971, Spain/South Africa), poet & fiction wr. in English
Nina Salaman (1877–1925, England), poet
Minna Salami (b. 1978, Finland/Nigeria), non-f. wr., col.
Virginia Brindis de Salas (1908–1958, Uruguay), poet
Fanny Zampini Salazar (1853–1931, Belgium/Italy), social wr.
Excilia Saldaña (1946–1999, Cuba), poet & ch. wr.
Marta Salgado,(b. 1947, Chile), non-f. wr.
Nino Salia (1898–1992, Georgia (Caucasus)/France), historian
Vibeke Salicath (1861–1921, Denmark), philanthropist & feminist
Zdena Salivarová (b. 1933, Czechoslovakia/Czech Republic/Canada/Newfoundland), nv.
Blanaid Salkeld (1880–1959, Ireland), poet, pw. & salonnière
Lotte Salling (b. 1964, Denmark), ch. wr.
Eva Sallis (Eva Hornung, b. 1964, Australia), nv.
Sally Salminen (1906–1976, Finland/Denmark), nv. in Swedish
Jessica Amanda Salmonson (b. 1950, United States), fiction wr. & es.
Rosa Julieta Montaño Salvatierra (b. 1946, Bolivia), feminist
Lydie Salvayre (b. 1948, France), wr.
Preeta Samarasan (living, Malaysia/United States), fiction wr.
Cecilia Samartin (b. 1961, Cuba/United States), wr. & psychologist
Magdalena Samozwaniec (1894–1972, Poland), fiction wr.
Fiona Sampson (b. 1968, England), poet & editor
Fiona Samuel (b. 1961, Scotland/New Zealand), pw.
Rhian Samuel (b. 1944, Wales), wr. on music
María Anna Águeda de San Ignacio (1695–1756, Mexico), religious wr. & abbess
María Josefa Acevedo Sánchez (1803–1861, Colombia), wr.
María Teresa Sánchez (1918–1994, Nicaragua), poet & fiction wr.
Matilde Sánchez (b. 1958, Argentina), wr. & col.
Socorro Sánchez (1830–1899, DR), journalist
Sonia Sanchez (b. 1934, United States), poet, pw. & ch. wr.
Milcha Sanchez-Scott (b. 1953, United States), pw.
George Sand (1804–1876, France), nv. & pw.
Virginia Sandars (1828–1922, Ireland), fiction wr.
Dorothy Lucy Sanders (1907–1987, Australia), nv.
Carmen Barajas Sandoval (1925–2014, Mexico), biographer
Mari Sandoz (1896–1966, United States), fiction wr. & biographer
Elspeth Sandys (b. 1940, New Zealand), fiction & non-f. wr. & poet
Barbara Sanguszko (1718–1791, Poland), poet & moralist
Parinoush Saniee (living, Iran/Persia), nv.
Indira Sant (1914–2000, India), poet
Miêtta Santiago (1903–1995, Brazil), poet, lawyer & feminist
Miriam Defensor Santiago (1945–2016, Philippines), social science wr.
Pura Santillan-Castrence (1905–2007, Philippines), es. in English
Abidemi Sanusi (living, Nigeria/England), nv.
Patrizia Sanvitale (b. 1951, Italy), wr. & sociologist
Rahel Sanzara (1894–1936, Germany), nv. and dancer
Sapphire, pen name of Ramona Lofton (b. 1950, United States), nv. & poet
Sappho (c. 630–570 BC, Ancient Greece), poet in Greek
Graciela Sapriza (b. 1945, Uruguay), historian & educator
Thouria Saqqat (1935–1952, Morocco), ch. wr.
Nafija Sarajlić (1893–1970, Turkey/Ottoman Empire/Yugoslavia), fiction wr.
Cristina Saralegui (b. 1948, Cuba/United States),
Dipti Saravanamuttu (b. 1960, Sri Lanka/Australia), poet & col.
Tibors de Sarenom (c. 1130 – post-1198, France), poet in Occitan
Georges Sari (1925–2012, Greece), nv. & ch. wr.
Beatriz Sarlo (b. 1942, Argentina), critic & non-f. wr.
Noo Saro-Wiwa (b. 1976, England/Nigeria), travel wr.
Nathalie Sarraute (1900–1999, Russia/France), nv. & es.
Albertine Sarrazin (1937–1967, France), nv.
Nathalie Sarraute (1900–1999, Russia/France), mem. & biographer
Homa Sarshar (living, Iran/Persia/United States), wr. & feminist
Ratna Sarumpaet (b. 1948, Indonesia), pw. & activist
May Sarton (1912–1995, Belgium/United States), poet, nv. & mem.
Sehba Sarwar (living, Pakistan/United States), es., poet & fiction wr.
Tomoko Sasaki (佐々木知子, b. 1965, Japan), nv. & lawyer
Marjane Satrapi (b. 1969, Iran/Persia), nv.
Šatrijos Ragana (1877–1930, Lithuania), fiction wr.
Krupabai Satthianadhan (1862–1894, India), nv.
Gerd Grønvold Saue (1930–2022, Norway), critic, nv. & hymnist
Stephanie Saulter (living, Jamaica), science fiction wr.
Henriette Sauret (1890-1976, France) poet, non-f. wr.
Tanya Savicheva (1930–1944, Soviet Union), child diarist
Sharon Savoy (living, United States), wr.
Ruth Sawyer (1880–1970, United States), nv. & ch. wr.
Aline Sax (b. 1984, Belgium), ch. & YA wr. in Flemish
Robin Sax (b. c. 1971, United States), crime wr. & col.
Dorothy L. Sayers (1893–1957, England), mystery wr. & es.
Isabelle Sbrissa (b. 1971, Switzerland), poet & pw. in French
Alcira Soust Scaffo (1924–1997, Uruguay), poet & educator
Nelle Scanlan (1882–1968, New Zealand), nv.
Patricia Scanlan (b. 1956, Ireland), fiction wr. & poet
Bente Scavenius (b. 1944, Denmark), art writer & critic
Igiaba Scego (b. 1974, Italy), wr,, journalist & activist
Oda Schaefer (1900–1988, Germany), poet & col.
Susan Fromberg Schaeffer (1940–2011, United States), nv. & poet
Margo Scharten-Antink (1868–1957, Netherlands), poet
Riana Scheepers (b. 1957, South Africa), ch. & fiction wr. & poet in Afrikaans
Caroline Schelling (1763–1809, Germany), es. & correspondent
Els de Schepper (b. 1965, Belgium), wr. & actor in Flemish
Sophie von Scherer (1817–1876, Austria/Austria-Hungary), nv.
Stacy Schiff (b. 1961, United States), non-f. wr. & col.
Mineke Schipper (b. 1938, Netherlands), fiction & non-f. wr.
Dorothea von Schlegel (1764–1839, Germany), nv.
Sylvia Schlettwein (b. 1975, Namibia), wr., teacher & critic
Eva Schloss (b. 1929, Austria/Austria-Hungary), mem. & Hc. survivor
Anka Schmid (b. 1961, Switzerland/Germany), screenwriter in German
Annie M. G. Schmidt (1911–1995, Netherlands), songwriter & ch. wr.
Elke Schmitter (b. 1961, Germany), nv. & poet
Pat Schneider (1934–2020, United States), wr., poet & editor
Diane Schoemperlen (b. 1954, Canada/Newfoundland), fiction wr.
Elisabeth of Schönau (c. 1129–1164, Germany), visionary in Latin
Patricia Schonstein (b. 1952, Zimbabwe/South Africa), nv., poet & ch. wr. in English
Jane Johnston Schoolcraft (1800–1842, United States), poet & fiction wr.
Amalie Schoppe (1791–1858, Germany), ch. wr.
Claudia Schoppmann (b. 1958, Germany), historian & social wr.
Solveig von Schoultz (1907–1996, Finland), poet, pw. & ch. wr. in Swedish
Martina Schradi (b. 1972, Germany), writer and cartoonist
Adele Schreiber-Krieger (1872–1957, Austria/Austria-Hungary), feminist wr. & politician
Olive Schreiner (1855–1920, South Africa), nv. & political wr. in English
Angelika Schrobsdorff (1927–2016, Germany), pw., nv. & actor
Rikke Schubart (b. 1966, Denmark), wr. & film scholar
Helga Schubert (b. 1940, Denmark), ch. wr. and academic
Ossip Schubin (1854–1934, Austria/Austria-Hungary), nv.
Julianne Schultz (b. 1956, Australia), non-f. wr. & academic
Anna Maria van Schurman (1607–1678, Germany/Netherlands), poet, scholar & painter
Barbara Schurz (b. 1973, Austria/Austria-Hungary), wr. & pw.
Jenefer Shute (living, South Africa/United States), nv.
Christine Schutt (b. 1948, United States), fiction wr.
Carolina Schutti (b. 1976, Austria/Austria-Hungary), fiction & non-f. wr.
Brigitte Schwaiger (1949–2010, Austria/Austria-Hungary), nv.
Amy Schwartz (1954–2023, United States), ch. wr.
Marie Sophie Schwartz (1819–1894, Sweden), nv.
Sibylla Schwarz (1621–1638, Germany), poet
Simone Schwarz-Bart (b. 1938, France), pw. & nv.
Annemarie Schwarzenbach (1908–1942, Switzerland), travel wr. in German
Samanta Schweblin (b. 1978, Argentina), fiction wr.
Monique Schwitter (b. 1972, Switzerland), fiction wr. in German
Sandra Scofield (b. 1943 United States), nv., es. & critic
Ann Scott (b. 1965, France), nv.
Caroline Lucy Scott (1784–1857, England), nv. & religious wr.
Cathy Scott (b. 1950s, United States), true crime wr. & biographer
Jane Scott (c. 1779–1839, England), pw.
Margaret Scott (1934–2005, Australia), poet, critic & academic
Mary-anne Scott (living, New Zealand), ch. & YA wr. & musician
Mary Scott (1888–1979, New Zealand), nv.
Robyn Scott (b. 1981, England/New Zealand), mem.
Rosie Scott (1948–2017, New Zealand/Australia), nv.
Madeleine de Scudéry (1607–1701, France), nv.
Jocelynne Scutt (b. 1947, Australia), non-f. wr. & lawyer
Mary Seacole (1805–1881, England/Jamaica), autobiographer & nurse
Nicole Sealey (b. 1979, US), poet
Molly Elliot Seawell (1860–1916, United States), es. & fiction wr.
Leïla Sebbar (b. 1941, Algeria/France), nv. & autobiographer
Alice Sebold (b. 1963, United States), nv.
Olga Sedakova (b. 1949, Soviet Union/Russia), poet
Amy Sedaris (b. 1961, United States), screenwriter & actor
Catharine Sedgwick (1789–1867, United States), nv.
Ekaterina Sedia (b. 1970, Soviet Union/United States), nv. & poet
Lisa See (b. 1955, China/United States), nv.
Wilhelmina Seegmiller (1866–1913, Canada/United States), wr, illustrator & art teacher
Sara Sefchovich (b. 1949, Mexico), nv. & academic
Edith Segal (1902–1997, United States), poet & songwriter
Lore Segal (b. 1928), fiction & ch. wr.
Marta Segarra (b. 1963, Spain), es.
Nakisanze Segawa (living, Uganda), poet & nv.
Anna Seghers (1900–1983, Germany), nv.
Alinah Kelo Segobye (fl 2000s, Botswana), activist & archaeologist
Mabel Segun (b. 1930, Nigeria), poet, pw., fiction & ch. wr.
Countess of Ségur (1799–1874, Ru/France), nv.
Anne de Seguier (fl. 1583, France), poet & salonnière
Dubravka Sekulić (b. 1980, Serbia), wr. & architect
Isidora Sekulić (1877–1958, Serbia), nv.
Taiye Selasi (b. 1979, Nigeria/Ghana/Gold Coast), fiction wr.
Pınar Selek (b. 1971, Turkey/Ottoman Empire/France), sociologist
Esther Seligson (1941–2010, Mexico), fiction wr., es. & poet
Yoshiko Sembon (せんぼんよしこ, b. 1928, China/Japan), screenwriter
Odete Semedo (b. 1959, Guinea-Bissau), wr. & educator
Mala Sen (1947–2011, India), biographer
Nabaneeta Dev Sen (1938–2019, India), poet, fiction wr. & academic
Eulalie de Senancour (1791–1876, France), fiction wr.
Fama Diagne Sène (b. 1969, Senegal), nv. & poet
Mallika Sengupta (1960–2011, India), poet
Poile Sengupta (b. 1948, India), pw. & ch. wr.
Olive Senior (b. 1941, Jamaica), poet & fiction wr.
Danzy Senna (b. 1970, United States), nv.
Raquel Señoret (1922–1990, Chile), poet
Iryna Senyk (1926–2009, Ukraine), poet
Seo Hajin (서하진, b. 1960, Korea), fiction wr.
Ha Seong-nan (하성란, b. 1967, Korea), wr.
Kim Seon-wu (김선우, b. 1970, Korea), poet
Ruta Sepetys (b. 1967, Lithuania/United States), fiction wr.
Dolores Gortázar Serantes (1872–1936, Sp.), nv. & non-f. wr.
Matilde Serao (1856–1927, Greece/Italy), nv. in Italian
Kate Seredy (1899–1975, Hungary/United States), ch. wr. & illustrator
Clara Sereni (1946–2018, Italy), autobiographer & fiction wr.
Gitta Sereny (1921–2012, Austria/Austria-Hungary/England), biographer & non-f. wr. in German & English
Cella Serghi (1907–1992, Romania), nv. & ch. wr.
Anna Lidia Vega Serova (b. 1968, Russia/Cuba), poet & fiction & ch. wr.
Namwali Serpell (b. 1980, Zambia), fiction wr.
Elisa Serrana (1930–2012, Chile), nv. & feminist
Marcela Serrano (b. 1951, Chile), nv.
Nina Serrano (b. 1934, United States), poet, wr. & storyteller
Yolanda García Serrano (b. 1958, Spain), screenwriter
Coline Serreau (b. 1947, France), screenwriter & pw.
Sabiha Sertel (1895–1968, Turkey/Ottoman Empire/Soviet Union), political wr.
Kadija Sesay (living, England), fiction wr., poet & editor
Henriett Seth F. (b. 1980, Hungary), poet, wr. & musician
Anya Seton (1904–1990, United States), nv.
Cynthia Propper Seton (1926–1982, United States), nv. & es.
Diane Setterfield (b. 1964, England), nv.
Mary Lee Settle (1918–2005, United States), nv. & mem.
Marie de Rabutin-Chantal, marquise de Sévigné (1626–1696, France), correspondent
Anna Seward (1747–1809, England), poet
Anna Sewell (1820–1887, England), nv.; Black Beauty
Elizabeth Sewell (1919–2001, England/United States), poet, nv. & academic
Elizabeth Missing Sewell (1815–1906, England), wr. on religion & education
Anne Sexton (1928–1974, United States), poet
Margaret Wilkerson Sexton (living, United States), nv.
Miranda Seymour (b. 1948, England), fiction & non-f. wr.
Carole Seymour-Jones (1943–2015, Wales), biographer & education wr.

Sf–Sk
Ippolita Maria Sforza (1446–1484, Italy), correspondent & poet
Mary Ann Shaffer (1934–2008, United States), wr., editor & librarian
Marietta Shaginyan (1888–1982, Russia/Soviet Union), fiction wr. & activist
Sara Shagufta (1954–1984, Pakistan), poet
Bina Shah (b. 1972, Pakistan), fiction wr. & col.
Madhuri R. Shah (fl. 20th century, India), education wr. & poet
Noorul Huda Shah (b. 1951, Pakistan), pw. & politician
Ryhaan Shah (living, Guyana), nv.
Husne Ara Shahed (living, Bangladesh), wr. & educator
Salma Shaheen (b. 1954, Pakistan), poet & fiction wr.
Shahnaz Fatmi (b. 1949, India), poet
Qaisra Shahraz (living, Pakistan/England), nv. & scriptwriter
Mahasti Shahrokhi (living, Iran/Persia), nv. & poet
Ruchoma Shain (1914–2013, United States), rebbetzin, wr. & teacher
Siba Shakib (living, Iran/Persia/United States), wr. & activist
Parveen Shakir (1952–1995, Pakistan), poet & civil servant
Sepideh Shamlou (b. 1968, Iran/Persia), nv.
Kamila Shamsie (b. 1973, Pakistan/England), fiction wr.
Muneeza Shamsie (b. 1944, Pakistan), es.
Shan Sa (山颯, b. 1972, China/France), nv. in Chinese & French
Eileen Shanahan (1901–1979, Ireland), poet
Elizabeth Shane (1877–1951, Ireland), poet, pw. & violinist
Ntozake Shange (1948–2018, United States), pw. & nv.
Mary Eulalie Fee Shannon (1824–1855, United States), poet
Shangguan Wan'er (上官婉兒, c. 664–710, China), poet, wr. & imperial consort
Shantichitra (b. 1978, India), nv. & academic
Jo Shapcott (b. 1953, England), poet, editor & lecturer
Olga Shapir (1850–1916, Russia), fiction wr. & feminist
Chava Shapiro (1876–1943, Russia/Soviet Union), wr. in Ukrainian
Margarita Sharapova (b. 1962, Soviet Union/Russia), fiction wr.
Emma Augusta Sharkey (1858–1802, United States), wr., col. & nv.
Niamh Sharkey (living, Ireland), ch. writer & illustrator
Jane Sharp (c. 1641–71, England), wr. on midwifery
Harriette Lucy Robinson Shattuck (1850–1937, United States), wr.
Elizabeth Shaw (1920–1992, Ireland), ch. wr. & illustrator
Helen Lilian Shaw (1913–1985, New Zealand), fiction wr. & poet
Tina Shaw (b. 1961, New Zealand), nv. & travel wr.
Tatiana Shchepkina-Kupernik (1874–1952, Russia), fiction wr, pw. & poet
Nessa Ní Shéaghdha (1916–1993, Iran/Persia), academic
Miranda Shearer (b. 1982, England), non-f. wr. & columnist
Eileen Sheehan (b. 1963, Ireland), poet
Helena Sheehan (b. 1944, Ireland), philosopher & historian
Alice Sheldon (1915–1987, United States), fiction wr.
Daphne Sheldrick (1934–2018, Kenya), wr. on animal husbandry
Shanta Shelke (1922–2002, India), poet & nv.
Mary Shelley (1797–1851, England), nv.; Frankenstein
Bonnie Shemie (b. 1949, United States/Canada/Newfoundland), ch. wr. & illustrator
Shen Rong (谌容, b. 1936, China), nv. & mem.
Shen Shanbao (沈善宝, 1808–1862, China), poet & biographer
Preeti Shenoy (b. 1971, India), nv. & social wr.
Nan Shepherd (1893–1981, Scotland), nv. & poet
Verene Shepherd (b. 1951, Jamaica), academic
Natalia Sheremeteva (1714–1771, Russia), mem.
Betsy Sheridan (1758–1837, Ireland), diarist
Frances Sheridan (1724–1766, Ireland), nv. & pw.
Shahla Sherkat (b. 1956, Iran/Persia), feminist wr.
Dorothy Sherrill (1901–1990, United States), ch. wr. & illustrator
Kate Brownlee Sherwood (1841–1914, United States), poet & col.
Mary Martha Sherwood (1775–1851, England), ch. wr.
Narmala Shewcharan (living, Guyana/England), nv. & poet
Gamar Sheyda (1881–1933, Azerbaijan), poet
Tomoka Shibasaki (柴崎友香, b. 1973, Japan), fiction wr.
Carol Shields (1935–2003 United States/Canada/Newfoundland), nv.; The Stone Diaries
Yoshiko Shigekane (重兼芳子, 1927–1963, Japan), fiction wr.
Karuho Shiina (椎名軽穂, b. 1975, Japan), manga creator
Izumi Shikibu (和泉式部, b. c. 976, Japan), poet
Murasaki Shikibu (紫式部, c. 973–1014 or 1025, Japan), nv. & poet; The Tale of Genji
Princess Shikishi (式子内親王, died 1201, Japan), poet
Michiru Shimada (島田満, 1959–2017, Japan), anime screenwriter
Rio Shimamoto (島本理生, b. 1983, Japan), fiction wr.
Aki Shimazaki (アキシマザキ, b. 1954, Canada/Newfoundland), nv. & academic
Reiko Shimizu (清水玲子, b. 1963, Japan), manga creator
Takako Shimura (志村貴子, b. 1973, Japan), manga creator
Kang Shin-jae (강신재, 1924–2001, Korea), nv., es. & pw.
Shin Kyeong-nim (신경림, b. 1936, Korea), wr.
Shin Kyung-sook (신경숙, b. 1963, Korea), fiction wr.
Jan Shinebourne (b. 1947, Guyana/England), nv.
Mayu Shinjo (新條まゆ, b. 1973, Japan), manga creator
Sharon Shinn (b. 1957, United States), nv.
Setsuko Shinoda (篠田 節子, b. 1955, Japan), fiction wr.
Chie Shinohara (篠原千絵, living, Japan), manga creator
Irma Shiolashvili (b. 1974, Georgia (Caucasus)), poet & col.
Kazuko Shiraishi (白石かずこ, b. 1931, Canada/Newfoundland), poet
Zandokht Shirazi (1909–1953, Iran/Persia), poet & activist
Warsan Shire (b. 1988, England), wr., poet & editor
Tanya Shirley (b. 1976, Jamaica), poet
Shirome (白女, 10th century, Japan), poet
Maria Shkapskaya (1891–1952, Russia/Soviet Union), poet & col.
Susy Shock (b. 1968, Argentina), wr., singer & actor
Ann Allen Shockley (b. 1927, United States), journalist & author
Dora Adele Shoemaker (1873–1962, United States), poet & playwright
Sei Shōnagon (清少納言, 965–1010, Japan), wr. & poet; The Pillow Book
Lola Shoneyin (b. 1974, Nigeria), nv. & poet
Dora Sigerson Shorter (1866–1918, Ireland), poet & sculptor
Fredegond Shove (1889–1949, England), poet
Elaine Showalter (b. 1941, United States), critic, feminist wr.
Shu Ting (舒婷, b. 1952, China), poet
Ana María Shua (b. 1951, Argentina), fiction & ch. wr., poet & pw.
Shunzei's daughter (藤原俊成女, c. 1171 – c. 1252, Japan), poet
Jenefer Shute (living, South Africa), nv.
Shirley Siaton (living, Philippines), fiction wr. & poet
Marie-Louise Sibazuri (b. 1960, Burundi), wr.
Gabriella Sica (b. 1950, Italy), poet
Anja Sicking (b. 1965, Netherlands), fiction wr.
Myra Sidharta (歐陽春梅, b. 1927, China/Indonesia), psychologist
Bapsi Sidhwa (b. 1938, Pakistan/United States), nv.
Mary Sidney (1561–1621, England), pw. & poet
Gonnie Siegel (1928–2005, United States), wr.
Raija Siekkinen (1953–2004, Finland), wr.
Catherine of Siena (1347–1380, Italy), nun, philosopher & theologian
Stella Sierra (1917–1997, Panama), poet and prose wr.
Fatou Niang Siga (1932–2022, Senegal), social wr.
Steinvör Sighvatsdóttir (died 1271, Iceland), poet & politician
Fríða Á. Sigurðardóttir (1940–2010, Iceland), fiction wr.
Jakobína Sigurðardóttir (1918–1994, Iceland), poet, nv. & ch. wr.
Lilja Sigurdardottir (b. 1972, Iceland), crime wr. & pw.
Ragna Sigurðardóttir (b. 1962, Iceland), wr. & artist
Steinunn Sigurðardóttir (b. 1950, Iceland), poet & nv.
Turið Sigurðardóttir (b. 1946, Faroe Islands), literary historian
Yrsa Sigurðardóttir (b. 1963), crime & ch. wr.
Birte Siim (b. 1945, Denmark), political writer
Joyce Sikakane (b. 1943, South Africa), col. & autobiographer in English
Joan Silber (b. 1945, United States), fiction wr.
Malla Silfverstolpe (1782–1861, Sweden), mem. & salonnière
Melanie Silgardo (b. 1956, India), poet
Leslie Marmon Silko (b. 1948, United States), Laguna Pueblo fiction wr. & poet
Jindeok of Silla (진덕여왕, fl. 647–654, Korea), poet & queen
Diná Silveira de Queirós (1911–1922, Brazil), nv., pw., es. & ch. wr.
Makeda Silvera (b. 1955, Canada/Newfoundland), fiction wr.
Alessandra Silvestri-Levy (b. 1972, Brazil), art wr.
Sim Yunkyung (심윤경, b. 1972, Korea), nv.
Elizabeth Simcoe (1762–1850, UK), diarist
Hazel Simmons-McDonald (b. 1947, Saint Lucia), poet & academic
Ana María Simo (living, Cuba/United States), pw. & nv. in English
Maria Simointytär (fl. late 17th century, Finland), poet
Kate Simon (1912–1990, Poland/United States), autobiographer & non-f. wr.
Germaine Simon (1921–2012, Luxembourg), nv. in German
Ieva Simonaitytė (1897–1978, Lithuania), nv.
Katherine Call Simonds (1865–?, United States), musician, singer, author, composer, social reformer
Ifigenija Zagoričnik Simonović (b. 1953, Yugoslavia/Slovenia), poet & ch. wr.
Paullina Simons (b. 1963, Soviet Union/United States), nv.
Dorothy Simpson (b. 1933, Wales), nv.
Helen Simpson (1897–1940, Australia), nv., pw. & historian
Ruth Simpson (1926–2008, United States), wr.
Laura Sims (living, United States), nv. & poet
Salla Simukka (b. 1981, Finland), nv. & critic
Hourya Benis Sinaceur (b. 1940, Morocco), philosopher
Jo Sinclair (pen name of Ruth Seid, 1913–1995, United States), wr.
May Sinclair (1862–1946, England), fiction wr. & poet
Helena Sinervo (b. 1961, Finland), poet & nv.
Ansuyah Ratipul Singh (1917–1978, South Africa), wr. in English & physician
Nalini Singh (b. 1977, New Zealand), nv.
Rajkumari Singh (1923–1979, Guyana), poet, pw. & activist
Sunny Singh (b. 1969, India), fiction & non-f. wr.
Sarah Singleton (b. 1966, England), nv. & ch. wr.
Kabita Sinha (1931–1999, India), poet & nv.
Mridula Sinha (1942–2020, India), nv. & public figure
Shumona Sinha (b. 1973, India/France), nv.
Johanna Sinisalo (b. 1958, Finland), science fiction & fantasy wr.
Lyubov Sirota (b. 1956, Ukraine), poet, wr. & pw.
Elinor Sisulu (b. 1958, Zimbabwe/South Africa), biographer & activist
Lakambini Sitoy (b. 1969, Philippines), nv. & teacher
Edith Sitwell (1887–1964, England), poet
Genet Sium (b. 1960s, Eritrea), novelist
Sivasankari (b. 1942, India), nv.
Rhoda Cosgrave Sivell (1874–1962, Iran/Persia/Canada/Newfoundland), poet & rancher
Maj Sjöwall (1935–2020, Sweden), mystery nv.
Staka Skenderova (1830–1891, Turkey/Ottoman Empire/Austria/Austria-Hungary), wr. in Serbian
Michelle Cruz Skinner (b. 1965, Philippines), wr. & educator
Ann Masterman Skinn (1747–1789, England), nv.
Rebecca Skloot (b. 1972, United States), science wr.
Sofija Skoric (living, Serbia/Canada/Newfoundland), activist & wr.
Simona Škrabec (b. 1968, Yugoslavia/Spain), critic & es.
Amalie Skram (1846–1905, Norway), nv. & feminist
Rūta Skujiņa (1907–1964, Latvia), poet
Vendela Skytte (1608–1627, Sweden), wr.

Sl–Sz
Sharon Slater (living, Ireland), local historian
Karin Slaughter (b. 1971, United States), crime wr.
Olga Slavnikova (b. 1957, Soviet Union/Russia), nv. & critic
Barbara Sleigh (1906–1982, England), ch. wr.
Esphyr Slobodkina (1908–2002, Russia/United States), ch. wr. & illustrator
Żanna Słoniowska (b. 1978, Ukraine/Poland), nv.
Gillian Slovo (b. 1952, South Africa/England), nv., pw. & mem.
Anna Smaill (b. 1979, New Zealand), poet & nv.
Elizabeth Smart (1913–1986, Canada/Newfoundland), nv. & poet
Dorothea Smartt (b. 1963, England), poet
Jane Smiley (b. 1948, United States), nv.
Alexandra Smirnova (1809–1882, Russia/France), mem.
Ali Smith (b. 1962, Scotland), nv.
Amanda Smith (1837–1915, United States), evangelist & autobiographer
Betty Smith (1896–1972, United States), nv.
Charlene Leonora Smith (living, South Africa), biographer & social wr. in English
Charlotte Turner Smith (1749–1806, England), poet & nv.
Dodie Smith (1896–1990, England), nv. & pw.; I Capture the Castle
Doris Buchanan Smith (1934–2002, United States), ch. nv.
Doris E. Smith (1919–pre–1994, Ireland), nv.
Georgina Castle Smith (1845–1933, England), ch. wr. & nv.
Jeanie Oliver Davidson Smith (1836–1925, United States), poet, romancist
Lillian Smith (1897–1966, United States), nv. & critic
Lura Eugenie Brown Smith (1864–?, United States), journalist, newspaper ed. & wr.
Maggie Smith (b. 1977, United States), poet, editor & wr.
Martha Pearson Smith (1836–?, United States), poet
Mary Bell Smith (1818-1894, United States), educator, social reformer, & wr.
Patti Smith (b. 1946, United States), poet, artist & songwriter
Pauline Smith (1882–1959, South Africa), fiction wr. & pw. in English
Stevie Smith (1902–1971, England), poet & nv.
Tracy K. Smith (b. 1972, United States), poet & educator
Zadie Smith (b. 1975, England), fiction wr. & es.
Elizabeth Smither (b. 1941, New Zealand), poet & fiction wr.
Annie M. P. Smithson (1873–1948, Ireland), fiction & nursing wr.
Saundra Smokes (1954–2012, United States), col. & pw.
Breda Smolnikar (b. 1941, Yugoslavia/Slovenia), nv. & ch. wr.
Cherry Smyth (b. 1960, Iran/Persia/England), academic, critic & poet
Ciara Elizabeth Smyth (living, Ireland), pw.
Anja Snellman (b. 1954, Finland), nv. & poet
Laura J. Snyder (b. 1964, United States), historian & biographer
Yan-kit So (1933–2001, China/England), cookery wr.
So Young-en (서영은, b. 1943, Korea), fiction wr.
Angelina Soares (1910–1985, Brazil), feminist wr.
Alawiya Sobh (b. 1955, Lebanon), col. & fiction wr.
Sofia Soboleva (1840–1884, Russia), fiction & ch. wr.
Gaele Sobott (b. 1956, Australia), fiction, ch. & non-f. wr.
Krishna Sobti (1925–2019, India), fiction wr. & es.
Susana Soca (1906–1959, Uruguay), poet
Edith Södergran (1892–1923, Finland), poet in Swedish
Zulu Sofola (1935–1995, Nigeria), pw. & pw.
Ružica Sokić (1934–2013, Serbia), wr. & actor
Sara Solá de Castellanos (1890–?, Argentina), poet, nv., pw., lyricist
Adeola Solanke (living, England/Nigeria), pw. & screenwriter
Amalia Domingo Soler (1835–1909, Spain), nv. & spiritist
Carmen Soler (1924–1985, Paraguay/Argentina), politician & poet
Frances-Anne Solomon (b. 1966, England/Canada/Newfoundland), broadcasting pw.
Laura Solomon (1974–2019, New Zealand/England), nv., pw. & poet
Elizabeth Solopova (b. 1965, England), philologist & academic
Polyxena Solovyova (1867–1924, Russia), poet & illustrator
Armonía Somers (1914–1994, Uruguay), fiction wr. & educator
Edith Somerville (1858–1949, Ireland), nv. & co-author
Angela Sommer-Bodenburg (b. 1948, Germany), ch. wr.
Son Bo-mi (선보미, b. 1980, Korea), fiction wr.
Cathy Song (b. 1955, United States), poet
Susan Sontag (1933–2004, United States), es. & nv.
Oh Soo-yeon (오수연, b. 1964, Korea), wr. & es.
Pilar Sordo (b. 1965, Chile), psychologist & wr.
Tracy Sorensen (living, Australia), nv. & academic
Fuyumi Soryo (b. 1959, Japan), manga wr.
Dido Sotiriou (1909–2004, Greece), nv. & pw.
Carmelina Soto (1916–1994, Comoros), poet
María de Zayas y Sotomayor (1590–1647 or 1661, Spain), nv.
Marzieh Sotoudeh (b. 1957, Iran/Persia/Canada/Newfoundland), wr.
Katariina Souri (b. 1968, Finland), nv., col. & artist
Noémia de Sousa (1926–2002, Mozambique), poet
Auta de Souza (1876—1901, Brazil), poet
Eunice de Souza (1940–2017, India), poet, critic & nv.
Fatou Ndiaye Sow (1937–2004, Senegal), poet & ch. wr.
Sevgi Soysal (1936–1976, Turkey/Ottoman Empire), fiction wr.
Edibe Sözen (b. 1961, Turkey/Ottoman Empire), sociologist
Isabelle Spaak (b. 1960, Belgium/France), fiction & non-f. wr. in French
Svetlana Spajić (b. 1971, Serbia), activist & translator
Muriel Spark (1918–2006, Scotland/England), nv.
Elisavet Spathari (living, Greece), archaeologist & wr.
Maria Luisa Spaziani (1923–2014, Italy), poet
Terry Spear (living, United States), romance nv.
Catherine Helen Spence (1825–1910, Australia), nv. & reformer
Eleanor Spence (1928–2008, Australia), ch. wr.
Vanessa Spence (b. 1961, Jamaica), nv.
Anne Spencer (1882–1975, United States), poet
Elizabeth Spencer (1921–2018, United States), fiction wr.
Dale Spender (b. 1943, Australia), feminist wr. & scholar
Jean Maud Spender (J. M. Spender, 1901–1970), crime wr.
Vanessa Spence (b. 1961, Jamaica), nv.
Leonora Speyer (1872–1956, United States), poet & violinist
Hilde Spiel (1911–1990, Austria/Austria-Hungary), es. & critic
Sabina Spielrein (1885–1942, Russia/Uganda), psychoanalyst
Lina Spies (b. 1939, South Africa), poet in Afrikaans
Erica Spindler (1957, United States), nv.
Magdalena Spínola (1896–1991, Guatemala), poet & educator
Dana Spiotta (b. 1966, United States), nv.
Julia Spiridonova (Yulka, b. 1972, Bulgaria), nv. & screenwriter
Jela Spiridonović-Savić (1891–1974, Serbia), poet & fiction wr.
Lize Spit (b. 1980, Belgium), nv. in Flemish
Andrea Spofford (b. 1986, United States), poet & es.
Harriet Elizabeth Prescott Spofford (1835–1921, United States), fiction wr. & poet
Eintou Pearl Springer (b. 1944, Trinidad), poet & pw.
Katja Špur (1908–1991, Austria/Austria-Hungary/Yugoslavia), ch. wr. & poet
Johanna Spyri (1827–1901, Switzerland), ch. wr. in German; Heidi
Biljana Srbljanović (b. 1970, Serbia), pw.
Atima Srivastava (b. 1961, India), fiction wr. & film director
Cornelia Laws St. John (?–1902, United States), poet, biographer
Cynthia Morgan St. John (1852–1919, United States), Wordsworthian, book collector, & wr.
Lauren St John (b. 1966, Zimbabwe), ch. nv.
Marilyn Stablein (b. 1946, United States), poet, es. & fiction wr.
Ilse von Stach (1879–1941, Germany), pw., nv. & poet
Eva Stachniak (b. 1952, Poland/Canada/Newfoundland), fiction wr.
Germaine de Staël (1766–1817, Switzerland/France), nv.
Jean Stafford (1915–1978, United States), fiction wr.
Pernilla Stalfelt (b. 1962, Sweden), ch. wr. & illustrator
Albena Stambolova (b. 1957, Bulgaria), psychologist & nv.
Gaspara Stampa (1532–1554, Italy), poet
Elizabeth Cady Stanton (1815–1902, United States), col. & es.
Margarita Stāraste-Bordevīka (1914–2014, Latvia), ch. wr.
Freya Stark (1893–1993, England), travel wr.
Nicolette Stasko (b. 1950, Australia), poet, nv. & non-f. wr.
Marie Šťastná (b. 1981, Czechoslovakia/Czech Republic), poet
Lucienne Stassaert (b. 1936, Belgium), poet in Flemish
Lilian Staveley (1878–1928, England), wr. & mystic
Christina Stead (1902–1983, Australia), fiction wr.
Betsey Ann Stearns (1830–1914, United States), non-f. wr.
Margret Steckel (b. 1934, Germany/Luxembourg), nv. in German
Irène Stecyk (b. 1937, Belgium), fiction wr. & poet
Danielle Steel (b. 1947, United States), nv.
Flora Annie Steel (1847–1929, England), nv.
Esther Baker Steele (1835–1911, United States), textbook wr. & editor
Anja Štefan (b. 1969, Yugoslavia/Slovenia), ch. wr.
Mirjana Stefanović (1939–2021, Serbia), wr.
Erla Stefánsdóttir (1935–2015, Iceland), story wr.
Marie Henriette Steil (1898–1930, Luxembourg), fiction wr. & col. in German & French
Alicia Steimberg (1933–2012, Argentina), fiction wr. & translator
Charlotte von Stein (1742–1827, Germany), pw.
Evaleen Stein (1863–1923, United States), poet, children's wr., limner
Gertrude Stein (1874–1946, United States), fiction wr., pw. & poet
Gisela Steineckert (b. 1931, Germany), radio pw. and screenwriter
Clara Steinitz (1852–1931), wr.
Kristín Steinsdóttir (b. 1946, Iceland), ch. wr. & pw.
Ginka Steinwachs (b. 1942, Germany), pw. and educator
Maria Antonia Scalera Stellini (1634–1704, Italy), poet & pw.
Carla Stellweg (living, Dutch East Indies/Mexico), art historian
Eira Stenberg (b. 1943, Finland), pw. & poet
Joanne Stepaniak (b. 1954, United States), vegan cookery wr.
Elizabeth Willisson Stephen (1856–1925, United States), nv., poet & wr.
Māmari Stephens (living, New Zealand), social wr. & preacher
Jadene Felina Stevens (1947–2013, United States), poet
Augusta Stevenson (1869–1976, United States), ch. wr. & teacher
Margo Taft Stever (living, United States), poet
Anna Louise Stevnhøj (b. 1963, Denmark), health wr.
Adela Blanche Stewart (1846–1910, England/New Zealand), autobiographer
Amanda Stewart (b. 1959, Australia), poet & performer
Jane Agnes Stewart (1860–1944, United States), wr., editor
Maria W. Stewart (1803–1897, United States), lecturer & col.
Mary Stewart (1916–2014, England), nv.
Susan Stewart (b. 1952, United States), poet, professor & critic
Maggie Stiefvater (b. 1981, United States), YA fiction wr.
Isabel Stilwell (b. 1960, Portugal), fiction & ch. wr.
Ilka Stitz (b. 1960, Germany), nv.
Cornelia Laws St. John (died 1902, United States), poet, biographer
Wilma Stockenström (b. 1933, South Africa), poet & prose wr. in Afrikaans
Cynthia Stockley (1873–1936, South Africa), nv. in English
Hilda van Stockum (1908–2006, Netherlands), ch. wr. & artist
Milica Stojadinović-Srpkinja (1828–1878, Serbia), poet
Ana Stojanoska (b. 1977, Yugoslavia/North Macedonia), wr. on theater & critic
Missouri H. Stokes (1838–1910, United States), non-f. wr.
Maša Stokić (b. 1966, Serbia), pw. & critic
Maria Engelbrecht Stokkenbech (1759–post-1806, Denmark), wr.
Ruth Stone (1915–2011, United States), poet
Sam Stone (b. 1965, England), fiction wr. & pw.
Marie Stopes (1880–1958, England), wr., paleo-botanist & birth-control advocate
Alfonsina Storni (1892–1938, Argentina), poet & pw.
Agnes L. Storrie (1865–1936, Australia), poet & wr.
Gertrude Story (1929–2014, Canada), poet & short story
Harriet Beecher Stowe (1811–1836, United States), nv.; Uncle Tom's Cabin
Mari Strachan (b. 1945, Wales), nv.
Susan Straight (b. 1960, United States), fiction wr., es. & academic
Ingela Strandberg (b. 1944, Sweden), poet, ch. wr. & novelist
Jennifer Strauss (b. 1933, Australia), poet & academic
Hesba Stretton (1832–1911, England), ch. wr.
Agnes Strickland (1796–1874, England), history wr. & poet
Sara Stridsberg (b. 1972, Sweden), nv.
Olga Stringfellow (b. 1923, New Zealand), fiction wr.
Eva Strittmatter (1930–2011, Germany), poet & ch. wr.
Rashida Strober (living, United States), pw.
Gertrude Strohm (1843–1927), American wr.
Eva Ström (b. 1947, Sweden), poet, nv. & critic
Eithne Strong (1923–1999, Ireland), poet & fiction wr.
Elizabeth Strout (b. 1956, United States), fiction wr.
Flora E. Strout (1867–1962, United States), non-f. wr., lyricist
Alessandra Macinghi Strozzi (c. 1408–1471, Italy), correspondent
Antje Rávic Strubel (b. 1974, Germany), fiction & textbook wr.
Karin Struck (1947–2006, Germany), fiction & social wr.
Anna Strunsky (1877–1964, Russia/United States), nv. & mem.
Amelie von Strussenfelt (1803–1847, Sweden), nv. & poet
Ulrika von Strussenfelt (1801–1873, Sweden), nv.
Jan Struther (1901–1953, Scotland/England), hymnist & nv.
Andrea Stuart (b. 1968, Barbados/England), historian & biographer
Lady Louisa Stuart (1757–1851, England), mem. & correspondent
Sheila Stuart (1892–1974, Scotland), ch. wr.
Toni Stuart (b. 1983, South Africa), poet in English
Heloneida Studart (1932–2007, Brazil), nv., es. & pw.
Lelde Stumbre (b. 1952, Latvia), pw. & politician
Sarah Stup (b. 1983, United States), wr.
Tanja Stupar-Trifunović (b. 1977, Yugoslavia/Bosnia-Herzegovina), poet & fiction wr.
Jacqueline Sturm (1927–2009, New Zealand), fiction wr.
Su Hui (蘇蕙, 4th century AD, China), poet
Su Qing (苏青, 1914–1982, China), es.
Su Xiaoxiao (蘇小小, c. 470–c. 501, China), poet & courtesan
Su Xuelin (蘇雪林, 1897–1999, China), scholar
SuAndi (b. 1951, England), performance poet, wr. & arts curator
Karla Suárez (b. 1969, Cuba), wr.
Margareta Suber (1892–1984, Sweden), nv., poet & ch. wr.
Arundhathi Subramaniam (living, India), poet, biographer & critic
Vidya Subramaniam (b. 1957, India), fiction wr.
Lucreția Suciu-Rudow (1859–1900, Austria/Austria-Hungary/Romania), poet
Olivia Sudjic (b. 1988, Serbia/England), nv.
Keiko Suenobu (すえのぶけいこ, b. 1979, Japan), manga creator
Yuki Suetsugu (末次由紀, b. 1975, Japan), manga creator
Meridel Le Sueur (1900–1996, United States), nv. & col.
Tea Sugareva (b. 1989, Bulgaria), poet & drama director
Sugathakumari (1934–2020, India), poet & activist
Etsu Inagaki Sugimoto (杉本鉞子, 1874–1950, Japan), autobiographer & nv.
Heo Su-gyeong (허수경, 1964–2018, Korea), poet
Azalia Suhaimi (b. 1985, Malaysia), poet & wr.
Laurence Suhner (b. 1968, Switzerland), nv. in French & graphic artist
Laura Jane Suisted (1840–1903, England/New Zealand), fiction wr., col. & poet
Iliriana Sulkuqi (b. 1951, Albania/United States), poet & col.
Sara Copia Sullam (1592–1641, Italy), poet & religious wr.
Deirdre Sullivan (living, Ireland), ch. writer
Jennifer Sullivan (b. 1945, Wales), ch. nv. & critic
Florence Sulman (1876–1965, England/Australia), non-f. educator
Sulpicia (fl. 1st century BC, Ancient Rome), poet in Latin
Sulpicia (fl. 1st century AD, Ancient Rome), satirist in Latin
Maud Sulter (1960–2008, Scotland), poet, artist & photographer
Anne Summers (b. 1945, Australia), wr. & col.
Barbara Summers (1944–2014, United States), wr., educator & model
Essie Summers (1912–1998, New Zealand), fiction wr. & poet
Merna Summers (b. 1933, Canada/Newfoundland), fiction wr.
Barbara Sumner (living, New Zealand), mem. & screenwriter
Kamala Surayya (1934–2009, India), poet & fiction wr.
Julia Suryakusuma (b. 1954, India/Indonesia), social wr. & col.
Jacqueline Susann (1918–1974, United States), nv.
Astrid Susanto (1936–2006, Indonesia), social wr.
Polina Suslova (1839–1918, Russia), autobiographer
Efua Sutherland (1924–1996, Ghana/Gold Coast), pw., ch. wr. & pw.
Esi Sutherland-Addy (living, Ghana/Gold Coast), academician & activist
Bertha von Suttner (1843–1914, Austria/Austria-Hungary), nv. & Nobel Prize winner
Han Suyin (周光瑚, 1916–2012, Chile), nv., mem. & es.; A Many-Splendoured Thing
Henriette de Coligny de La Suze (1618–1673, France), poet
Eva Švankmajerová (1940–2005, Czechoslovakia/Czech Republic), wr. & artist
Annakarin Svedberg (b. 1934, Sweden), fiction wr.
Maria Sveland (b. 1974, Sweden), social analyst
Hanne Marie Svendsen (b. 1933, Denmark), wr. & broadcaster
Karolina Světlá (1830–1899, Austria/Austria-Hungary), nv. in Czech
Alexandra Sviridova (b. 1951, Russia/United States), screenwriter & political wr.
Anni Swan (1875–1958, Finland), ch. book wr.
Catharina Charlotta Swedenmarck (1744–1813, Sweden/Finland), pw. & poet in Swedish
Elinor Sweetman (c. 1861–1922, Ireland), poet
May Swenson (1913–1988, United States), poet & pw.
Susie Forrest Swift (1862–1916, United States), editor & wr.
Anna Świrszczyńska (1909–1984, Poland), poet
Lucy Robbins Messer Switzer (1844–1922, United States), temperance activist
Syang (Simone Dreyer Peres, b. 1968, Brazil), erotic wr.
Karen Syberg (b. 1945, Denmark), wr. & gender researcher
Sydney, Lady Morgan (1781–1859, Ireland), nv.
Bobbi Sykes (1943–2010, Australia), poet & wr.
Khady Sylla (1963–2013, Senegal), nv. & screenwriter
Vanda Symon (b. 1969, New Zealand), nv.
Magda Szabó (1917–2007, Hungary), nv., poet & pw.
Anna Szatkowska (1928–2015, Poland/Switzerland), resistance fighter & autobiographer
Noémi Szécsi (b. 1976, Hungary), nv.
Júlia Székely (1906–1986, Hungary), nv. & biographer
Madelon Szekely-Lulofs (1899–1958, Indonesia/Netherlands), fiction wr.
Mária Szepes (1908–2007, Hungary), esoteric & science fiction nv.
Małgorzata Szumowska (b. 1973, Poland), screenwriter
Edina Szvoren (b. 1974, Hungary), nv., poet & musician
Wisława Szymborska (1923–2012, Poland), poet

T

Ta–Th
Marga T (b. 1943, Indonesia), fiction & ch. wr.
Gladys Taber (1899–1980, United States), nv. & nature wr.
Eileen Tabios (b. 1960, Philippines/United States), poet & fiction wr.
Haruko Tachiiri (たちいりハルコ, b. 1949, Japan), ch. manga creator
Maria Tacu (1949–2010, Romania), poet & prose wr.
Chimako Tada (多田智満子, 1930–2003, Japan), poet
Kaoru Tada (多田かおる, 1960–1999, Japan), manga creator
Tadano Makuzu (只野真葛, 1763–1825, Japan), socio-political wr.
Véronique Tadjo (b. 1955, Ivory Coast), poet, nv. & artist
Pia Tafdrup (b. 1952, Denmark), poet, nv. & pw.
Gina Marissa Tagasa-Gil (living, Philippines), screenwriter
Valerie Tagwira (living, Zimbabwe), nv.
Táhirih (1814 or 1817–1852, Iran/Persia), poet & theologian
Daina Taimiņa (b. 1954, Latvia), mathematician
Ise no Taiu (伊勢大輔, early 11th century, Japan), poet
Princess Tajima (但馬皇女, died 708, Japan), poet
Judit Dukai Takách (1795–1836, Hungary), poet
Nobuko Takagi (高樹のぶ子, b. 1946, Japan), fiction wr.
Rumiko Takahashi (高橋留美子, b. 1957, Japan), manga creator
Takako Takahashi (高橋たか子, 1932–2013, Japan), fiction wr.
Yelizaveta Tarakhovskaya (1891–1968, Russia/Soviet Union), poet, pw. & ch. wr.
Kaoru Takamura (髙村薫, b. 1953, Japan), fiction wr.
Hinako Takanaga (高永ひなこ, living, Japan), manga creator
Mitsuba Takanashi (高梨みつば, b. 1975, Japan), manga creator
Takasue's daughter (菅原孝標女, c. 1008 – post-1059, Japan), travel wr.
Haneko Takayama (高山羽根子, b. 1975, Japan), fiction wr.
Kazumi Takayama (高山一実, b. 1994, Japan), fiction & self-help wr.
Lisa Takeba (竹葉リサ, b. 1983, Japan), screenwriter
Keiko Takemiya (竹宮惠子, b. 1950, Japan), manga creator
Hiroko Takenishi (竹西寛子, b. 1929, Japan), fiction wr. & critic
Kei Takeoka (竹岡圭, b. 1969, Japan), motoring wr.
Jill Talbot (b. 1970, United States), fiction & non-f. wr. & poet
Niloufar Talebi (living, England/United States), mem. & librettist
Maila Talvio (1871–1951, Finland), fiction & non-f. wr.
Tamairangi (fl. 1820s, New Zealand), Maori poet
Susanna Tamaro (b. 1957, Italy), nv.
Clotilde Tambroni (1758–1817, Italy), linguist & poet
Altaír Tejeda de Tamez (1922–2015, Mexico), fiction wr., poet & pw.
Leilani Tamu (living, New Zealand), poet & politician
Yumi Tamura (田村由美, living, Japan), manga creator & nv.
Wassyla Tamzali (b. 1941, Algeria), wr., feminist & politician
Amy Tan (b. 1952, United States), nv.
Yellow Tanabe (田辺イエロウ, b. 1990s, Japan), manga creator
Meca Tanaka (田中メカ, b. 1976), manga wr.
Mitsu Tanaka (田中美津, b. 1945), feminist wr.
Shelley Tanaka (living, Canada/Newfoundland), non-f. ch. wr.
Suna Tanaltay (1933–2021, Turkey/Ottoman Empire), poet & wr.
Shweta Taneja (living, India), fiction wr.
Arina Tanemura (種村有菜, b. 1978, Japan), manga creator
Reay Tannahill (1929–2007, Scotland/England), historian
Lian Tanner (b. 1951, Australia), ch. wr.
Goli Taraghi (b. 1939, Iran/Persia), fiction wr.
Yelizaveta Tarakhovskaya (1891–1968, Russia/Soviet Union), poet, pw. & ch. wr.
Sooni Taraporevala (b. 1957, India), screenwriter
Violet Targuse (1884–1937, New Zealand), pw.
Lisa Ysaye Tarleau (1885–1952, United States), fiction wr.
Rosalia Tarnavska (1932–2020, Ukraine), poet
Fanny Tarnow (1779–1862, Germany), journal & fiction wr.
Judith Tarr (b. 1955, United States), wr.
Trinidad Tarrosa-Subido (1912–1994, Philippines), linguist & poet
Sofía Tartilán (1829–1888, Spain), fiction wr., es, journalist, ed.
Donna Tartt (b. 1963, United States), nv.
Ana Tasić (b. 1978, Serbia), theater critic
Afzal Tauseef (1936–2014, Pakistan), social wr. & col.
Franziska Tausig (c. 1895–1989, Austria/Austria-Hungary/China), mem.
Jemima von Tautphoeus (1807–1893, Iran/Persia/Germany), nv.
Malvina Tavares (1866–1939, Brazil), poet & anarchist
Zora Tavčar (b. 1928, Yugoslavia/Italy), fiction wr., es. & poet in Slovenian
Yōko Tawada (多和田葉子, b. 1960, Japan/Germany), poet & fiction wr.
Raymonda Tawil (b. 1940, Palestine/Malta), mem.
Alice Taylor (b. 1938, Ireland), mem. & ch. wr.
Ann Taylor (1782–1866, England), poet & critic
Anna Taylor (b. 1982, New Zealand), fiction wr.
Cory Taylor (1955–2016, Australia), ch. wr. & mem.
Elizabeth Taylor (1912–1975, England), fiction wr.
Glenda R. Taylor (b. 1955, United States), scholar & poet
Grace Taylor (b. c. 1984, New Zealand), poet & academic
Grace Oladunni Taylor (b. 1937, Nigeria), biochemist
Jane Taylor (1783–1824, England), poet & nv.
Jane Taylor (b. 1956, South Africa), political wr, nv. & librettist in English
Kay Glasson Taylor (Daniel Hamline, 1893–1998, Australia), ch. wr.
Minnetta Theodora Taylor (1860–1911, United States), poet, lyricist, textbook wr.
Susie Taylor (1848–1912, United States), teacher & memoir wr.
Teresia Teaiwa (1968–2017, Kiribati/United States), poet & academic
Roma Tearne (b. 1954, Sri Lanka/England), nv. & artist
Sara Teasdale (1884–1933, United States), poet
Mrs. Bartle Teeling (1851–1906, United Kingdom), wr.
Teffi (1872–1952, Ru/Soviet Union), poet, pw. & fiction wr.
Anyte of Tegea (fl. early 3rd century BC, Ancient Greece), poet in Greek
Nivaria Tejera (1929–2016, Cuba/France), nv.
Sevim Tekeli (1924–2019, Turkey/Ottoman Empire), science historian
Latife Tekin (b. 1957, Turkey/Ottoman Empire), nv.
Sylviane Telchid (1941–2023, Guadeloupe), wr. & translator
Telesilla (fl. 510 BC, Ancient Greece), poet in Greek
Olena Teliha (1906–1942, Ru/Soviet Union), poet in Ukrainian
Janne Teller (b. 1964, Denmark/United States), nv. & es. in English
Lygia Fagundes Telles (1923–1922, Brazil), fiction wr.
Ece Temelkuran (b. 1973, Turkey/Ottoman Empire), political wr. & poet
Ana Tena (b. 1966, Spain), wr. in Aragonese
Claudine Guérin de Tencin (1682–1749, France), nv. & salonnière
Emma Tennant (1937–2017, England), nv.
Kylie Tennant (1912–1988, Australia), nv., pw. & ch. wr.
Margaret Tennant (living, New Zealand), historian
Lourdes Teodoro (b. 1946, Brazil), poet & academic
Lisa St Aubin de Terán (b. 1953, England), nv. & mem.
Laura Terracina (1519 – c. 1577, Italy), poet
Mary Church Terrell (1863–1954, United States), activist & col.
Jasmina Tešanović (b. 1954, Serbia), es., fiction wr. & translator
Josephine Tey (1896–1952, Scotland), mystery nv.
Hilary Tham (1946–2005, Malaysia/United States), poet
Najiya Thamir (1926–1988, Syria/Tunisia), fiction wr., es. & radio pw.
Romila Thapar (b. 1931, India), historian
Susie Tharu (b. 1943, India), writer & activist
Celia Thaxter (1835–1894, United States), poet & story wr.
Françoise Thébaud (born 1952, France), non-f. wr.
Naseem Thebo (1948–2012, Pakistan), fiction wr. & educator
Vicky Theodoropoulou (b. 1958, Greece), historian & nv.
Marcia Theophilo (b. 1941, Brazil), poet
Rama Thiaw (b. 1978, Senegal), screenwriter
Renata Thiele (living, Poland/Germany), fiction writer
Marianne Thieme (b. 1972, Netherlands), wr. & politician
Madeleine Thien (b. 1974, Canada/Newfoundland), fiction wr.
Angela Thirkell (Leslie Parker, 1890–1961), nv.
Adrienne Thomas (1897–1980, Germany/Austria/Austria-Hungary), nv.
Audrey Thomas (b. 1935, Canada/Newfoundland), fiction wr.
Caitlin Thomas (1913–1994, Wales), mem.
Chantal Thomas (b. 1945, France), wr. and historian
Édith Thomas (1909–1970, France), nv. and historian
Elean Thomas (1947–2004, Jamaica), poet, nv. & activist
Elizabeth Thomas (1770/1771–1855, England), nv. & religious poet
Gilles Thomas (1929–1985, France), science fiction wr.
Gladys Thomas (1934–2022, South Africa), poet & pw.
Isabel Thomas (living, England), ch. non-f. wr.
Louie Myfanwy Thomas (1908–1968, Wales), wr. & nv.
Margaret Thomas (1843–1929, Australia), travel wr., poet & artist
Ngaire Thomas (1943–2012, New Zealand), autobiographer
Rosemary Thomas (1901–1961, United States), poet.
Stephanie Thomas (living, United States), author, public speaker, voice actor, professor
E. S. L. Thompson (1848–1944, United States), poet, pw, shot story wr. 
Jeanne I. Thompson (living, Bahamas), pw. & lawyer
Judith Thompson (b. 1954, Canada/Newfoundland), pw.
Kirsten Moana Thompson (b. 1964, New Zealand), film scholar
María Luisa Artecona de Thompson (1919–2003, Paraguay), poet & pw.
Mette Thomsen (b. 1970, Denmark), nv.
Brynhildur Þórarinsdóttir (b. 1970, Iceland), ch. wr.
Magdalene Thoresen (1819–1903, Denmark/Norway), poet, fiction wr. & pw.
Samantha Thornhill (living, Trinidad), poet & critic
Valgerður Þóroddsdóttir (b. 1989, Iceland), poet
Margaret Farrand Thorp (1891–1970, United States), wr. & academic
Rose Hartwick Thorpe (1850–1938, United States), poet & wr.
Kirsten Thorup (b. 1942, Denmark), poet & fiction wr.
Torfhildur Þorsteinsdóttir (1845–1918, Iceland), fiction wr.
Kerstin Thorvall (1925–2010, Sweden), nv.
Ólína Þorvarðardóttir (b. 1958, Iceland), poet & social scientist
Hester Thrale (Mrs Piozzi, 1741–1821, Wales/England), diarist & wr.
María Lilja Þrastardóttir (b. 1986, Iceland), col. & activist
Holly Throsby (b. 1978, Australia), nv.
Ketty Thull (1905–1987, Luxembourg), cookery writer in German
Katherine Cecil Thurston (1874–1911, Ireland), nv.
Martha L. Poland Thurston (1849–1898, United States), social leader, philanthropist, & wr.
Johanna Thydell (b. 1980, Sweden), nv.

Ti–Tz
Tian Yuan (田原, b. 1985, China), nv. & songwriter
María Dhialma Tiberti (1928–1987, Argentina), nv. & poet
Jindra Tichá (b. 1937, Czechoslovakia/Czech Republic/New Zealand), fiction wr. & academic
Anna-Clara Tidholm (b. 1946, Sweden), ch. wr. & illustrator
Tie Ning (鐵凝, b. 1957, China), fiction wr.
Dorothea Tieck (1799–1841, Germany), Shakespeare translator
Edith Tiempo (1919–2011, Philippines), poet & wr. in English
Mary Tighe (1772–1810, Iran/Persia/England), poet
Eeva Tikka (b. 1939, Finland), wr.
Märta Tikkanen (b. 1935, Finland), wr. in Swedish
Stella Tillyard (b. 1957, England/United States), history wr. & academic
Lydia H. Tilton (1839–1915, United States), educator, activist, journalist, poet, lyricist
Petronella Johanna de Timmerman (1723–1786, Netherlands), poet & scientist
Timrava (1867–1951, Austria/Austria-Hungary/Czechoslovakia/Czech Republic), fiction wr. & pw. in Slovak
Lillian Tindyebwa (living, Uganda), wr.
Annette Tison (b. 1942, France), wr. and architect
Kata Tisza (b. 1980, Russia/Hungary), nv. in Hungarian
Liudmila Titova (fl. 1940s, Ukraine), poet
Manjit Tiwana (b. 1947, India), poet
Maya Tiwari (b. 1952, Guyana/United States), social & religious writer
Totilawati Tjitrawasita (1945–1982, Indonesia), fiction wr.
Nino Tkeshelashvili (1874–1956, Georgia (Caucasus)/Soviet Union), ch. wr. & suffragist
Miriam Tlali (1933–2017), South Africa), nv. in English
Fatima Tlisova (b. 1966, Soviet Union/Russia), political wr.
Keiko Tobe (戸部けいこ, 1957–2010, Japan), manga creator
Lily Tobias (1887–1984, Wales), nv., pw. & activist
Yana Toboso (枢やな, b. 1984, Japan), manga creator
Ada Josephine Todd (1858–1904, United States), wr.
Ruth D. Todd (1878–?, United States), fiction wr.
Miriam Toews (b. 1964, Canada/Newfoundland), nv.
Ekaterine Togonidze (b. 1981, Georgia (Caucasus)), nv. & activist
Laura Tohe (b. 1952, United States), wr.
Marianne du Toit (b. 1970, South Africa), prose wr. in English
Olga Tokarczuk (b. 1962, Poland), wr. & poet; 2018 Nobel prizewinner
Viktoriya Tokareva (b. 1937, Soviet Union/Russia), fiction & screenwriter
Hari Tokeino (時計野は, b. 1979, Japan), manga creator
Arzu Toker (b. 1952, Turkey/Ottoman Empire/Germany), political wr. in German
Aida Toledo (b. 1952, Guatemala), poet & fiction wr.
Natalia Toledo (b. 1968, Mexico), poet in Spanish & Zapotec
Natalia Tolstaya (1943–2010, Soviet Union/Russia), fiction wr.
Sophia Tolstaya (1844–1919, Russia), diarist
Tatyana Tolstaya (b. 1951, Soviet Union/Russia), wr. & TV presenter
Velta Toma (1912–1999, Latvia/Canada/Newfoundland), poet
Consuelo Tomás (b. 1957, Panama), pw., poet & nv.
Glen Tomasetti (1929–2003, Australia), songwriter, nv. & poet
Angharad Tomos (b. 1958, Wales), wr. & activist
Canan Topçu (b. 1965, Turkey/Ottoman Empire/Germany), academic
Angela Topping (b. 1954, England), poet, critic & wr.
Elena Topuridze (1922–2004, Soviet Union/Georgia (Caucasus)), philosopher & non-f. wr.
Fatma Aliye Topuz (1862–1936, Turkey/Ottoman Empire), nv.
Cécile Tormay (1876–1937, Hungary), wr. & activist
Lucrezia Tornabuoni (1425–1482, Italy), poet
Rita Tornborg (b. 1926, South Africa/Sweden), fiction wr.
Ana Rosa Tornero (1907–1984, Bolivia), wr. & reformer
Malú Huacuja del Toro (b. 1961, Mexico), nv., pw. & screenwriter
Anabel Torres (b. 1948, Comoros), poet
Elena Torres (1893–1970, Mexico), political wr. & educator
Raymunda Torres y Quiroga (?–?, Argentina), wr. & activist
Wal Torres (b. 1950, Brazil), sexologist
Gabriela Torres Olivares (b. 1982, Mexico), fiction
Rowena Tiempo Torrevillas (b. 1951, Philippines), poet, fiction wr. & es.
Maria Antonietta Torriani (1840–1920, Italy), fiction & etiquette wr.
Susana Richa de Torrijos (b. 1924, Panama), es. & educator
Lucrezia Tornabuoni (1427–1482, Italy), poet, pw. & politician
Nicole Tourneur (1950–2011, France), nv.
Jessica Townsend (b. 1985, Australia), ch. wr.
Ema Tōyama (遠山えま, b. 1981, Japan), manga creator
Marta Traba (1923–1983, Argentina), art critic & nv.
Bahaa Trabelsi (b. 1966, Morocco), nv. in French
Mona Innis Tracy (1892–1959, New Zealand), poet & fiction wr.
Catharine Parr Traill (1802–1899, England/Canada/Newfoundland), wr. & naturalist
Barbara Trapido (b. 1941, South Africa/England), nv.
Maria von Trapp (1905–1987, Austria/Austria-Hungary/United States), wr.
Clara Augusta Jones Trask (1839–1905, United States), wr.
P. L. Travers (1889–1996, Australia/England), ch. wr.
Carmen Clemente Travieso (1900–1983, Venezuela), biographer & col.
Maria Treben (1907–1991, Austria/Austria-Hungary), herbalist
Catherine Tregenna (living, Wales), pw. & scriptwriter
Melesina Trench (1768–1827, Ireland), wr, poet & diarist
Ulla Trenter (1936–2019, Sweden), wr.
Natasha Trethewey (b. 1966, United States), poet
Jill Trevelyan (b. 1963, New Zealand), art scholar
Rachel Trezise (b. 1978, Wales), fiction & non-f. wr.
Soti Triantafyllou (b. 1957, Greece), nv. & col.
Adriana Trigiani (living, Italy/United States), wr. & filmmaker
Barbara Margaret Trimble (Margaret Blake, B. M. Gill, 1921–1995, Wales), thriller wr.
Sarah Trimmer (1741–1810, England), ch. wr. & critic
S. K. Trimurti (1912–2008, Dutch East Indies/Indonesia), writer & teacher
Nadine Trintignant (b. 1934, France), screenwriter & nv.
Elsa Triolet (1896–1970, Russia/France), correspondent & nv. in Russian and French
Geeta Tripathee (b. 1972, Nepal), poet, literary critic & wr.
Flora Tristan (1803–1844, France), wr., feminist & activist
Licia Troisi (b. 1980, Italy), fiction wr.
Frances Trollope (1779–1863, England), nv. & travel wr.
Joanna Trollope (b. 1943, England), nv.
Catherine Trotter (1679–1749, Scotland/England), nv., pw. & philosopher
Trotula (11th–12th century, Spain), wr. on medicine in Latin
Birgitta Trotzig (1929–2011, Sweden), fiction & non-f. wr.
Jean Trounstine (b. 1946, United States), activist, wr. & academic
Una Troy (1910–1993, Ireland), nv. & pw.
Jagoda Truhelka (1864–1957, Austria/Austria-Hungary/Yugoslavia), wr. & educator
Meta Truscott (1917–2014, Australia), diarist & historian
Sojourner Truth (1797–1883, United States), feminist
Máire Mhac an tSaoi (1922–2021, Ireland), scholar & poet in Irish
Eleonora Tscherning (1817–1890, Denmark), mem. & painter
To-wen Tseng (曾多聞, living, China/United States), wr., col. & ch. wr.
Novuyo Rosa Tshuma (b. 1988, Zimbabwe), fiction wr.
Mariam Tsiklauri (b. 1960, Soviet Union/Georgia (Caucasus)), poet & ch. wr.
Masami Tsuda (津田雅美, b. 1970, Japan), manga creator
Mikiyo Tsuda (つだみきよ, living, Japan), manga creator
Kikuko Tsumura (津村記久子, b. 1978, Japan), fiction wr.
Yūko Tsushima (津島佑子, 1947–2016, Japan), fiction wr., es. & critic
Marina Tsvetaeva (1892–1941, Soviet Union), poet
Barbara W. Tuchman (1912–1988, United States), wr. & historian
Lily Tuck (b. 1938, United States), fiction wr.
Mary Frances Tyler Tucker (1837–1902, United States), poet
Kateřina Tučková (b. 1980, Czechoslovakia/Czech Republic), nv.
Elizabeth Tudor (Lady Hasanova, b. 1978, Azerbaijan), nv.
Nadia Tueni (1935–1983, Lebanon), poet in French
Magdalena Tulli (b. 1955, Poland), nv.
Anastasia Tumanishvili-Tsereteli (1849–1932, Georgia (Caucasus)/Soviet Union), wr., educator & feminist
Ayfer Tunç (b. 1964, Turkey/Ottoman Empire), fiction wr. & researcher
Leelo Tungal (b. 1947, Estonia), poet, librettist & ch. wr.
Eliza Dorothea Cobbe, Lady Tuite (c. 1764–1850, Iran/Persia/England), poet & ch. wr.
Fadwa Tuqan (1917–2003, Palestine), poet
Evgenia Tur (1815–1892, Ru), nv. & critic
Nika Turbina (1974–2002, Ukraine), poet
Roxane Turcotte (born 1952, Canada), ch. wr.
Clorinda Matto de Turner (1852–1909, Peru), fiction & non-f. wr.
Ethel Turner (1872–1958, Australia), ch. wr.
Jann Turner (b. 1964, South Africa), nv. & screenwriter in English
Lilian Turner (1867–1956, Australia), ch. nv.
Megan Whalen Turner (b. 1965, United States), fantasy wr.
Telcine Turner-Rolle (1944–2012, Bahamas), pw., poet & educator
Josipina Turnograjska (1833–1854, Austria/Austria-Hungary), poet & fiction wr. in Slovenian
Helene Tursten (b. 1954, Sweden), fiction wr.
Agata Tuszynska (b. 1957, Poland), wr., poet & col.
Emma Rood Tuttle (1839–1916, United States), wr. & poet
Flora May Woodard Tuttle (1868–1931, United States), wr. & col.
Diana Tutton (1915–1991, England), nv.
Kerima Polotan Tuvera (1925–2011, Philippines), fiction wr. & es.
Violet Tweedale (1862–1936, Scotland), wr. & poet
Chase Twichell (b. 1950, United States), poet & professor
Lizzie Twigg (c. 1882–1933, Ireland), poet
Sarah Lowe Twiggs (1839–1920, United States), poet 
Hilda Twongyeirwe (living, Uganda), wr. & editor
Anne Tyler (b. 1941, United States), fiction wr. & critic
Katharine Tynan (1859–1931, Ireland), nv. & poet
Aale Tynni (1913–1997, Soviet Union/Finland), poet
Vasia Tzanakari (b. 1980, Greece), fiction writer

U

Rosana Ubanell (b. 1958, Spain), nv.
Bahriye Üçok (1919–1990, Turkey/Ottoman Empire), academic & activist
Ada Udechukwu (b. 1960, Nigeria), poet & artist
Miwa Ueda (上田美和, living, Japan), manga creator
Toshiko Ueda (上田トシコ, 1917–2008, Japan), manga creator
Kimiko Uehara (上原きみ子, b. 1946, Japan), manga creator
Brenda Ueland (1891–1985 United States/Norway), wr. & teacher
Zoila Ugarte de Landívar (1864–1969, Ecuador), editor & suffragist
Jenny Uglow (b. 1940s, England), biographer
Dubravka Ugrešić (b. 1949, Yugoslavia/Netherlands), fiction wr. in Croat
Hebe Uhart (1936–2018, Argentina), fiction wr.
Uhwudong (어우동, c. 1440–1480, Korea), wr. & poet
Lesya Ukrainka (1871–1913, Ukraine), poet
Adaora Lily Ulasi (b. 1932, Nigeria), nv. & col.
Leonora Christina Ulfeldt (1621–1698, Denmark), prison autobiographer
Anya Ulinich (b. 1973, Russia/United States), fiction wr.
Lyudmila Ulitskaya (b. 1943, Russia), fiction wr.
Linn Ullmann (b. 1966, Norway), nv. & critic
Regina Ullmann (1884–1961, Switzerland), poet in German
Rosina Umelo (b. 1930, Nigeria), fiction & ch. wr.
Chica Umino (羽海野チカ, living, Japan), manga creator
Luz María Umpierre (b. 1947, Puerto Rico), poet, critic & activist
Lily Unden (1908–1989, Luxembourg), poet, painter & concentration camp survivor
Marie Under (1883–1980, Estonia), poet
Terry Underwood (b. 1944, Australia), wr.
Sigrid Undset (1882–1949, Norway), nv.; 1928 Nobel Prize in Literature
Chika Unigwe (b. 1974, Nigeria), fiction wr.
Jane Unrue (living, United States), wr. & educator
Makerita Urale (fl. 1990s, New Zealand), pw. & film director
Azucena Grajo Uranza (1929–2012, Philippines), fiction wr. & pw.
Ellen Urbani (b. 1968, United States), wr.
Joan Ure (1918–1978, Scotland), poet & pw.
Ofelia Uribe de Acosta (1900–1988, Colombia), suffragist
Jane Urquhart (b. 1949, Canada/Newfoundland), nv. & poet
Jessie Urquhart (1890–1948, Australia), nv. & col.
Julia Urquidi (1926–2010, Bolivia), mem.
Lourdes Urrea (b. 1954, Mexico), poet, fiction & YA wr.
Arantxa Urretabizkaia (b. 1947, Spain), nv., screenwriter & poet in Basque
Matilde Urrutia (1912–1985, Chile), mem.
Yuki Urushibara (漆原友紀, b. 1974, Japan), manga creator
Shereen Usdin (b. 1962, South Africa), non-f. wr. in English
Carmina Useros (1928–2017, Spain), wr. & artist
O. V. Usha (b. 1948, India), poet & fiction wr.
Ayu Utami (b. 1968, Indonesia), fiction wr.
Kaari Utrio (b. 1942, Finland), nv.
Sarah Elizabeth Utterson (1781–1851), gothic short story wr.
Arja Uusitalo (b. 1951, Finland), poet & col.
Bea Uusma (b. 1966, Sweden), ch. & non-f. wr.
Uvavnuk (fl. early 20th century, Canada/Newfoundland), Inuit poet
Pauline Uwakweh (living, Nigeria), ch. & feminist wr.
Mellie Uyldert (1908–2009, Netherlands), astrologer & wr.
Buket Uzuner (b. 1955, Turkey/Ottoman Empire), fiction & travel wr.

V

Elena Văcărescu (1864–1947, Romania), poet, nv. & mem.
Urvashi Vaid (1958–2022, India/United States), socio-political wr.
Vaidehi (b. 1945, India), fiction wr., es. & pw.
Aparna Vaidik (living, India), historian & educator
Kaajal Oza Vaidya (b. 1966, India), fiction & screenwriter
Gertrude Vaile (1878–1954, US), non-f. wr.
Celestine Vaite (b. 1966, Tt), nv.
Matrena Vakhrusheva (1918–2000, Soviet Union/Russia), Mansi poet & storyteller
Katri Vala (1901–1944, Finland), poet
Lobat Vala (b. 1930, Ireland), poet & activist
Aline Valangin (1889–1986, Switzerland), fiction wr. in German
Indrė Valantinaitė (b. 1984, Lithuania), poet
Gisela Valcárcel (b. 1963, Peru), autobiographer
Olvido García Valdés (b. 1950, Spain), poet & es.
Zoé Valdés (b. 1959, Cuba), nv. & poet
Alisa Valdes-Rodriguez (b. 1968, United States), nv. & screenwriter
Mercedes Valdivieso (1924–1993, Chile), nv.
Patrizia Valduga (b. 1953, Italy), poet
Aline Valek (b. 1986, Brazil), wr., nv. & illustrator
Hannelore Valencak (1929–2004, Austria/Austria-Hungary), nv., poet & ch. wr.
Elcina Valencia (b. 1963, Colombia), poet & teacher
Luize Valente (b. 1966, Brazil), nv. & filmmaker
Elvira Farreras i Valentí (1913–2005, Spain), wr.
Jean Valentine (1934–2020, United States), poet
Jenny Valentine (b. 1970, Wales), ch. wr.
Luisa Valenzuela (b. 1938, Argentina), fiction wr.
Valérie Valère (1961–1981, France), autobiographer
Leda Valladares (1919–2012, Argentina), poet & folklorist
Estrella del Valle (b. 1971, Mexico), poet
Virginia Vallejo (b. 1949, Comoros/United States), wr. & refugee
Gunnel Vallquist (1918–2016, Sweden), religious wr. & es.
Elise Valmorbida (b. 1961, Australia), fiction & non-f. wr.
P. Valsala (b. 1938, India), fiction wr. & activist
Maria Valtorta (1897–1961, Italy), poet & religious wr.
Jennifer Vanasco (b. 1971, United States), col.
Jane Vandenburgh (b. 1948, United States), nv., mem. & non-f. wr.
Ellen Oliver Van Fleet (1842–1893, United States), poet & hymn wr.
Blanca Varela (1926–2009, Peru), poet
Fred Vargas (b. 1957, France), historian & nv.
Virginia Vargas (b. 1945, Peru), sociologist
Galina Varlamova (1951–2019, Russia), Evenk philologist
Mahadevi Varma (1907–1987, India), poet & educator
Rahel Varnhagen (1771–1833, Germany), es. & correspondent
Marja-Liisa Vartio (1924–1966, Finland), poet & fiction wr.
M. Vasalis (1909–1998, Netherlands), poet & psychiatrist
Vibeke Vasbo (b. 1944, Denmark), wr. & activist
Ana Vásquez-Bronfman (1931–2009, Chile/France), nv. & sociologist
Elizabeth Vassilieff (1917–2007, Australia), wr. & critic
Marie Vassiltchikov (1917–1978, Russia/Germany), diarist
Ganga Bharani Vasudevan (living, India), fiction wr.
Kapila Vatsyayan (1928–2020, India), arts wr.
Hilda Vaughan (1892–1985, Wales), fiction wr.
Fan Vavřincová (1917–2012, Czechoslovakia/Czech Republic), screenwriter & nv.
Joana Vaz (c. 1500 – post-1570, Portugal), humanist & poet
Reetika Vazirani (1962–2003, India/United States), poet & educator
Mâliâraq Vebæk (1917–2012, Gd), ethnographer & nv.
Tatiana Vedenska (b. 1976, Soviet Union/Russia), nv.
Cornelia van der Veer (1609–1674, Netherlands), poet
Carmen Acevedo Vega (1913–2006, Ecuador), poet & wr.
Janine Pommy Vega (1942–2010, United States), poet
Luz Méndez de la Vega (1919–2012, Guatemala), wr., poet and actor
Saša Vegri (1934–2010, Yugoslavia/Slovenia), poet & ch. wr.
Amélia Veiga (b. 1932, Portugal/Angola), poet
Dolores Veintimilla (1829–1857, Ecuador), poet
Marieta de Veintemilla (1855–2007, Ecuador), wr. & politician
Helen Velando (b. 1961), ch. & YA wr.
Jacoba van Velde (1903–1985, Netherlands), nv. & pw.
Teresa Román Vélez (1925–2021, Comoros), wr. & chef
Svetlana Velmar-Janković (1933–2014, Serbia), nv. & chronicler
Socorro Venegas (b. 1972, Mexico), fiction wr.
Aurora Venturini (1922–2015, Argentina), fiction wr., poet & es.
Yvonne Vera (1964–2005, Zimbabwe), fiction wr.
Grazia Verasani (b. 1964, Italy), nv., pw. & songwriter
Anastasiya Verbitskaya (1861–1928, Russia/Soviet Union), nv. & pw.
Raquel Verdesoto (1910–1999, Ecuador), wr., poet & activist
Sonia Romo Verdesoto (living, Ecuador), poet
Patricia Verdugo (1947–2008, Chile), wr. & activist
Caroline Vermalle (b. 1973, France), nv.
Seda Vermisheva (1932–2020, Soviet Union/Russia), poet, economist & activist
María Sáez de Vernet (1800–1858), chronicler of Argentine Falkland settlers
Barbara Vernon (1916–1978, Australia), pw. & scriptwriter
Angela Veronese (1778–1847, Italy), poet
Moira Verschoyle (1903–1985, Iran/Persia/England), nv. & pw.
Octavia Walton Le Vert (1811–1877, United States), wr.
Sonja Veselinović (b. 1981, Serbia), wr.
Lidia Veselitskaya (1857–1936, Russia/Soviet Union), nv. & mem.
Aglaja Veteranyi (1962–2002, Romania/Switzerland), nv. & circus performer
Stephanie Vetter (1884–1974, Netherlands/Belgium), nv. in Dutch
Noelle Vial (1959–2003, Ireland), poet
Luz de Viana (1900–1995, Chile), wr. & painter
Josefina Vicens (1911–1988, Mexico), nv. & screenwriter
Ana Vicente (1943–2015, Portugal), social wr.
Pilar de Vicente-Gella (1942–2016, Spain), wr.
Marie Anne de Vichy-Chamrond, marquise du Deffand (1697–1780, France), correspondent
Patrizia Vicinelli (1943–1991, Italy), poet & col.
Soledad Fariña Vicuña (b. 1943, Chile), poet
Mary Therese Vidal (1815–1873, Australia), nv.
Maja Vidmar (b. 1961, Yugoslavia/Slovenia), poet
Clara Viebig (1862–1952, Germany), nv. & pw.
Alice Vieira (b. 1943, Portugal), ch. wr.
Marie Vieux-Chauvet (1916–1973, Haiti), nv., poet & pw.
Delphine de Vigan (b. 1966, France), nv.
Frida Vigdorova (1915–1965, Soviet Union/Russia), col. & nv.
Vicki Viidikas (1948–1998, Australia), poet & prose wr.
Elo Viiding (b. 1974, Estonia), poet
Vijayalakshmi (b. 1960, India), poet
Vaira Vīķe-Freiberga (b. 1937, Latvia), non-f. wr. & politician
Božena Viková-Kunětická (1862–1934, Austria/Austria-Hungary/Czechoslovakia/Czech Republic), wr. & politician
Monica Vikström-Jokela (b. 1960, Finland), scriptwriter & wr. in Swedish
Maruxa Vilalta (1932–2014, Spain/Mexico), pw.
Esther Vilar (b. 1935, Argentina), non-f. wr. & pw. in German
Idea Vilariño (1920–2009, Uruguay), poet, es. & critic
Iryna Vilde (1907–1982, Australia/Ukraine), fiction wr.
Linda Vilhjálmsdóttir (b. 1958, Iceland), wr., poet & pw.
Lettie Viljoen (b. 1948, South Africa), wr. in Afrikaans
Andrea Villarreal (1881–1963, Mexico),
Clara Villarosa (b. 1930, United States), wr.
Marie-Catherine de Villedieu (1640–1683, France), pw. & fiction wr.
Gabrielle-Suzanne de Villeneuve (1685–1755, France), fiction wr.
Phillippa Yaa de Villiers (b. 1966, South Africa), poet
Hermine Villinger (1849–1917, Germany), nv. & short-story wr.
Louise Leveque de Vilmorin (1902–1969, France), nv., poet & col.
Elsa G. Vilmundardóttir (1932–2008, Iceland), geologist
Carmen Villoro (b. 1958, Mexico), psychologist, poet & ch. wr.
Nada Vilotijević (b. 1953, Serbia), wr. & professor
Isabella Vincentini (b. 1954, Italy), poet, es. & critic
Simona Vinci (b. 1970, Italy), nv. & ch. wr.
Paulina Vinderman (b. 1944, Argentina), poet & translator
Elfrida Vipont (1902–1992), ch. wr.
Pinki Virani (b. 1959, India), wr. & activist
Elene Virsaladze (1911–1977, Georgia (Caucasus)/Soviet Union), folklorist
Anna Visscher (1583–1651, Netherlands), poet & artist
Jenny Visser-Hooft (1888–1939, Netherlands), travel wr.
Ida Vitale (b. 1923, Uruguay), art wr.
Eugenia Viteri (b. 1928, Ecuador), nv. & anthologist
Drífa Viðar (1920–1971, Iceland), wr. & artist
Susan Visvanathan (b. 1957, India), social anthropologist & fiction wr.
Annie Vivanti (1866–1942, England/Italy), poet & nv. in English & Italian
Renée Vivien (1877–1909, England/France), poet
María Argelia Vizcaíno (b. 1955, Cuba), col. & screenwriter
Helen Vlachos (1911–1995, Gk), autobiographer & col.
Simone van der Vlugt (b. 1966, Netherlands), adult & YA fiction wr.
Angela Vode (1892–1985, Yugoslavia/Slovenia), feminist, concentration camp survivor & autobiographer
Michelle Vogel (b. 1972, Australia), film historian, wr. & editor
Clara Voghan (b. 1957, Argentina), romance wr.
Ellen Bryant Voigt (b. 1943, United States), poet & es.
Helene Voigt-Diederichs (1875–1961, Germany), fiction & travel wr.
Marija Vojskovič (1915–1997, Yugoslavia/Slovenia), fiction wr.
Zinaida Volkonskaya (1792–1862, Russia), poet, fiction wr. & pw.
Hava Volovich (1916–2000, Soviet Union/Russia), mem., actor & Gulag survivor
Élisabeth Vonarburg (b. 1947, France), science fiction wr.
Yekaterina Vorontsova-Dashkova (1743–1810, Russia), mem.
Ornela Vorpsi (b. 1968, Albania/France), wr. & photographer
Ida Vos (1921–2006, Netherlands), mem. & Hc. survivor
Erika Vouk (b. 1941, Yugoslavia/Slovenia), poet
Vira Vovk (1926–2022, Ukraine/Brazil), poet, nv. & pw.
Marko Vovchok (1833–1907, Russia), nv. & translator
Julia Voznesenskaya (1940–2015, Soviet Union/Russia), wr.
Ethel Voynich (1864–1960, Iran/Persia/England), nv. & musician
Susanna de Vries (b. 1936, Australia), biographer
Jurgen Vsych (b. 1966, United States), director & screenwriter
Beb Vuyk (1905–1991, Dutch East Indies/Netherlands), non-f. wr.
Divna M. Vuksanović (b. 1965, Serbia), non-f. wr. & philosopher
Kerttu Vuolab (b. 1951), wr. in Sámi & illustrator
Anna Vyrubova (1884–1964, Russia/Finland), princess & mem.
Marita van der Vyver (b. 1958, South Africa/France), es. & fiction wr. in Afrikaans

W

Wa–Wh
Mira W (b. 1951, Indonesia), fiction wr.
Kit de Waal (b. 1960, England/Ireland), nv.
Elly de Waard (b. 1940, Netherlands), poet & critic
Charity Waciuma (b. 1936, Kenya), nv. & YA wr.
Natto Wada (和田夏十, 1920–1983, Japan), scriptwriter & col.
Helen Waddell (1889–1965, Ireland/England), poet & academic
Elizabeth Wagele (1939–2017, United States), wr. & cartoonist
Nora Wagener (b. 1989, Luxembourg), fiction & ch. wr. & pw. in German
Elin Wägner (1882–1949, Sweden), fiction & non-f. wr. & biographer
Alena Wagnerová (b. 1936, Czechoslovakia/Czech Republic), wr. in Czech & German
Magdalena Wagnerová (b. 1960, Czechoslovakia/Czech Republic), ch. & screenplay wr.
Raza Naqvi Wahi (1914–2002, India), poet
Bronisława Wajs (1908–1987, Poland), poet & singer
Joanna Wajs (b. 1979, Poland), poet & prose wr.
Paula Wajsman (1939–1995, Argentina), poet & psychologist
Chisako Wakatake (若竹千佐子, b. 1954, Japan), fiction wr.
Vikki Wakefield (b. 1970, Australia), YA wr.
Diane Wakoski (b. 1937, United States), poet
Kate Walbert (b. 1961, United States), fiction wr.
Elizabeth Walcott-Hackshaw (b. 1964, Trinidad), wr. & academic
Anne Waldman (b. 1945, United States), poet
Adelaide Cilley Waldron (1843–1909, United States), wr., editor
Rosmarie Waldrop (b. 1935, United States), poet & translator
Brígida Walker (1863–1942, Chile), education wr.
Alice Walker (b. 1944, United States), fiction wr. & poet
Kath Walker (1920–1993, Australia), poet, fiction wr. & artist
Lucy Walker (1907–1987, Australia), nv.
Margaret Walker (1915–1998, United States), poet & nv.
Mildred Walker (1905–1998, United States), nv.
Rebecca Walker (b. 1968, United States), wr., feminist & activist
Rosa Kershaw Walker (1840s–1909, United States), non-f. wr., editor, journalist
Annie Russell Wall (1835–1920, United States), non-f. wr.
Dorothy Wall (1894–1942, Australia), ch. wr. & illustrator
Maureen Wall (1918–1972, Ireland), historian
Doreen Wallace (1897–1989, England), nv.
Louise Wallace (b. 1983, New Zealand), poet
Michele Wallace (b. 1952, United States), feminist wr. & critic
Effie Waller Smith (1879–1960, United States), poet
Jeannette Walls (b. 1960, United States), wr. & col.
Anne Walmsley (b. 1931, England), scholar, critic & wr.
Carla Walschap (b. 1932, Belgium), wr. in Flemish
Catherine Walsh (b. 1964, Ireland), poet
Jill Paton Walsh (1937–2020, England), nv. & ch. wr.
María Elena Walsh (1930–2011, Argentina), poet, nv. & pw.
Dolores Walshe (b. 1949, Ireland), fiction wr. & pw.
Elizabeth Hely Walshe (1835–1869, Ireland), ch. wr. & historian
Minnie Gow Walsworth (1859–1947, United States), poet
Lettice D'Oyly Walters (1880–1940), poet and editor
Silja Walter (1919–2011, Switzerland), poet & religious wr. in German
Amy Catherine Walton (1849–1939, England), ch. wr.
Jo Walton (b. 1964, Wales), fantasy & science fiction wr.
Susana, Lady Walton (1926–1983, Argentina), non-f. wr. in English
Ania Walwicz (1951–2020, Australia), poet
Zuhur Wanasi (b. 1936, Algeria), fiction wr. & politician
Shangguan Wan'er (上官婉兒, c. 664–710, China), poet & prose wr.
Lulu Wang (王露露, b. 1960, China/Netherlands), nv. in Dutch
Ayeta Anne Wangusa (b. 1971, Uganda), wr. & activist
Zukiswa Wanner (b. 1976, South Africa/Kenya), col. & nv.
Lise Warburg (b. 1932, Denmark), tapestry wr. & weaver
Harriet Ward (1808–1873, England), non-f. & fiction wr. in English
Jesmyn Ward (b. 1977, United States), nv. & academic
Mary Augusta Ward (Mrs Humphry Ward, 1851–1920, England), nv.
Sarah Ward (living, England), nv. & critic
Julia Rush Cutler Ward (1796–1824, United States), poet
Marie Warder (1927–2014, South Africa/Canada/Newfoundland), nv. & medical wr.
Mary Ware (writer) (1828–1915, United States), poet, wr.
Anna Laetitia Waring (1823–1910, Wales), poet & hymnist
Marilyn Waring (b. 1952, New Zealand), economist & politician
Gertrude Chandler Warner (1890–1978, United States), ch. wr.
Sally Warner (living, United States), children & young adult fiction wr.
Susan Warner (1819–1885, United States), ch. wr. & songwriter
Maureen Warner-Lewis (b. 1943, Trinidad/Nigeria), wr. on linguistics
Myriam Warner-Vieyra (1939–2017, Guadeloupe/Senegal), poet & nv.
Blanche Warre-Cornish (1848–1922, England), nv., biographer & conversationalist
Crystal Warren (living, South Africa), poet in English
Dianne Warren (b. 1950, Canada/Newfoundland), fiction wr. & pw.
Patricia Nell Warren (pen name Patricia Kilina, 1936–2019, United States), nv., poet & journalist
Wendy Wasserstein (1950–2006, United States), pw.
Masako Watanabe (わたなべまさこ, b. 1929, Japan), manga creator
Taeko Watanabe (渡辺多恵子, b. 1960, Japan), manga creator
Yuu Watase (渡瀬悠宇, b. 1970, Japan), manga creator
Risa Wataya (綿矢りさ, b. 1984, Japan), nv.
Sarah Waters (b. 1966, Wales), nv.
Elizabeth Watkin-Jones (1887–1966, Wales), ch. wr.
Joy Watson (1938–2021, New Zealand), ch. wr.
Mary Watson (b. 1975, South Africa/Ireland), fiction wr.
Fiona Watt (living, England), ch. wr.
Monique Watteau (b. 1929, Belgium), fiction wr. in French
Margaret Way (living, Australia), nv.
Kyra Petrovskaya Wayne (1918–2018, Soviet Union/United States), fiction & YA wr.
Maria Webb (1804–1873, Ireland), religious wr. & Quaker historian
Catherine Webb (b. 1986, England), nv.
Mary Webb (1881–1927, England), nv.; Precious Bane
Delia Weber (1900–1982, Dominica), wr. & rights advocate
Elizabeth Weber (b. 1923, no information after 1960s, South Africa), nv. & ch. wr. in Afrikaans
Marianne Weber (1870–1954, Germany), sociologist & activist
Augusta Webster (1837–1894, England), poet, pw. & es.
Mary Morison Webster (1894–1980, Scotland/South Africa), novelist & poet
Yvonne Weekes (b. 1958, England/Montserrat), pw. & poet
Heleen Sancisi-Weerdenburg (1944–2000, Netherlands), Anc. historian
Wei Hui (周衛慧, b. 1973), nv.
Anna Weidenholzer (b. 1984, Austria/Austria-Hungary), wr. & col.
Simone Weil (1909–1943, France), mystic & philosopher
Hannah Weiner (1928–1997, United States), poet
Liz Weir (b. 1950, Northern Ireland), ch. wr.
Anna Elisabet Weirauch (1887–1970, Germany), nv. & lesbian wr.
Ruth Weiss (1928–2020, Germany/United States), poet, pw. & performer
Jane Meade Welch (1854–1931, United States), col. & lecturer
Fay Weldon (1931–2023, England), wr., es. & pw.
Dorothy Wellesley (1889–1956, England), poet
Charlotte Fowler Wells (1814–1901, United States), phrenologist
Ida B. Wells (1862–1931, United States), wr. & sociologist
Martha Wells (b. 1964, United States), nv.
Louise Welsh (b. 1965, England/Scotland), fiction wr.
Eudora Welty (1909–2001, United States), fiction wr. & photographer
Viola S. Wendt (1907–1986, United States), poet & educator
Miriam Were (b. 1940, Kenya), public health wr. & academic
Timberlake Wertenbaker (b. 1946, United States/England), pw. & screenwriter
Sara Wesslin (b. 1991, Finland), wr. in Sámi
Dorothy West (1907–1998, United States), fiction wr.
Jane West (1758–1852, England), nv., poet & pw.
Jessamyn West (1902–1984, United States), fiction wr.
Joyce West (1908–1985, New Zealand), nv. & ch. wr.
Rebecca West (1892–1983, England), nv. & travel wr.
Anna Westberg (1946–2005, Sweden), nv. & non-f. wr.
Helena Westermarck (1857–1938, Finland), nv., biographer & painter
Elizabeth Jane Weston (1581/1582–1612, England/Bohemia), poet (in Latin)
Amy Westervelt (b. 1978, United States), col. & wr.
Elizabeth Wetmore (living, United States), fiction wr.
Josefina Wettergrund (1830–1903, Sweden), poet, nv. & non-f. wr.
Lydia Wevers (1950–2021, New Zealand), wr. on literature
Anne Wharton (1659–1685, England), poet
Edith Wharton (1862–1937, United States), fiction wr.
Leslie What (b. 1955, United States), fiction wr.
Nadia Wheatley (b. 1949, Australia), ch. nv. & wr.
Phillis Wheatley (1753–1784, United States), poet
Cora Stuart Wheeler (1852–1897, United States), poet, wr.
Dorothy Whipple (1893–1966, England), nv.
Evelyn Whitaker (1857–1903, England), nv.
Agnes Romilly White (1872–1945, Iran/Persia/Northern Ireland), nv.
Annabelle White (living, New Zealand), cookery wr.
Antonia White (1899–1980, England), fiction wr.
Dorothy White (c. 1630–1686, England), religious wr.
Ellen G. White (1827–1915 United States), evangelist
Emily White, (1839–1936, England/New Zealand), gardening wr.
Ida L. White (fl. late 19th century, Iran/Persia/Northern Ireland), poet & feminist
Laura Rosamond White (1844–1922, United States), wr., poet, editor
Nettie L. White (c. 1850–1921, United States), stenographer, suffragist
Stella Whitelaw (b. 1941) (UK), novelist and journalist
Lilian Whiting (1847–1942, United States), col. & wr.
Margaret Whitlam (1919–2012, Australia), social wr. & autobiographer
Myne Whitman (b. 1977, Nigeria), nv.
Isabella Whitney (b. c. 1540 – post-1624, England), poet
Phyllis A. Whitney (1903–2008, United States), nv.
Sarah J. C. Whittlesey (1824–1896), American nv, poet, hymn wr.
Weam Namou (b. 1970), Iraqi-American

Wi–Wy
Anne Wiazemsky (1947–2017, Germany/France), nv. and actor
Nancy Wicker (living, United States), art historian
Anna Wickham (1884–1947, England), poet
Zoë Wicomb (b. 1948, South Africa/Scotland), fiction wr.
Margaret Widdemer (1884–1978, United States), poet & nv.
Ulrika Widström (1764–1841, Sweden), poet & translator
Elisabeth of Wied (Carmen Sylva, 1843–1916, Romania), poet, pw. & Queen Consort
Blanca Wiethüchter (1947–2004, Bolivia), wr. & historian
Elsa Wiezell (1926–2014, Paraguay), poet & painter
Kate Douglas Wiggin (1856–1923, United States), educator & ch. wr.
Marianne Wiggins (b. 1947, United States), nv.
Susan Wiggs (b. 1958, United States), nv.
Emma Howard Wight (1863–1935, United States), wr., novelist, playwr.
Rosemary Wighton (1925–1994, Australia), wr. & editor
Dora Wilcox (1873–1953, Australia), poet & pw.
Ella Wheeler Wilcox (1850–1918, United States), poet
Margaret Wild (b. 1948, South Africa/Australia), ch. wr.
Sarah Wild (living, South Africa), science wr. in English
Jane Wilde (1821–1896, Ireland), poet
Charlotte Wilder (1898–1980, United States), poet
Cherry Wilder (1930–2002, New Zealand), science fiction wr.
Laura Ingalls Wilder (1867–1957, United States), ch. wr.; Little House on the Prairie
Lynn Wilder (b. 1952, United States), wr.
Ottilie Wildermuth (1817–1877, Germany), fiction & ch. wr.
Faith Wilding (b. 1943, Paraguay/United States), wr. in English & artist
Kate Wilhelm (1928–2018, United States), fiction wr.
Kim Wilkins (b. 1966, Australia), fiction wr.
Verna Wilkins (b. 1940s, Grenada/England), ch. wr.
Christine Wilks (born 1960), British digital writer and artist
Marian Wilkinson (b. 1954, Australia), wr. & col.
Alice Willard (1860–1936, United States), nonf. wr.
Louise Collier Willcox (1865–1929, United States), wr., editor
Sandrine Willems (b. 1968, Belgium/France), wr. in French
Anna Williams (1706–1783, Wales/England), poet & companion to Samuel Johnson
Cathy Williams (b. 1957, Trinidad/England), romance wr.
Donna Williams (1963–2017, Australia), wr., musician & sculptor
Eley Williams (living, England), wr.
Faldela Williams (1952–2014, South Africa), cookery wr. in English
Helen Maria Williams (1762–1827, England), nv. & poet
Jane Williams (Ysgafell, 1806–1885, Wales), poet & es.
Liz Williams (b. 1965, England), science fiction wr.
Margery Williams (1881–1944, England/United States), ch. wr.
Maria Jane Williams (c. 1795–1873, Wales), folklorist & musician
Ruth C. Williams (1897–1962, Australia), ch. wr.
Sherley Anne Williams (1944–1998, United States), poet & nv.
Mabel Williamson (fl. mid-20th century, United States), missionary
Connie Willis (b. 1945, United States), science fiction wr.
Elizabeth Willis (b. 1961, United States), poet, critic & professor
Dorrit Willumsen (b. 1940, Denmark), fiction wr.
Katherine Wilmot (c. 1773–1824, Iran/Persia/England), diarist & travel wr.
Amrit Wilson (b. 1941, India/England), wr., journalist & activist
Anne Elizabeth Wilson (1901–1946, United States/Canada) non-f. wr., poet & ed.
Cynthia Wilson (b. 1934, Barbados), fiction wr. & educator
Ella B. Ensor Wilson (1838–1913, United States), social reformer & non-f. writer 
Florence Mary Wilson (c. 1870–1946, Iran/Persia/Northern Ireland), poet
Harriett C. Wilson (1916–2002, England), sociologist
Harriet E. Wilson (1825–1900, United States), nv.
Hazel Hutchins Wilson (1898–1992, United States), ch. wr.
Helen Wilson (1869–1957, New Zealand), autobiographer & community leader
Ibbie McColm Wilson (1834–1908, United States), poet
Jacqueline Wilson (b. 1945, England), ch. wr.
Margaret Wilson (living, Australia), TV wr.
Margaret Wilson (1882–1973, United States), nv.
Krysty Wilson-Cairns (b. 1987, Scotland), screenwriter
Évelyne Wilwerth (b. 1947, Belgium), poet & fiction wr. in French
Tara June Winch (b. 1983, Australia), fiction wr.
Sheila Wingfield (1906–1992, England/Ireland), poet
Laurie Winkless (living, Iran/Persia/England), science wr.
Dallas Winmar (living, Australia), pw.
Sarah Winnemucca (1841–1891, United States), lecturer & autobiographer
Eliza Winstanley (Ariele, 1818–1882, Australia), wr. & actor
Kathleen Winter (b. 1960, Canada/Newfoundland), fiction wr., col. & screenwriter
Jeanette Winterson (b. 1959, England), nv.
Jeneverah M. Winton (1837–1904, United States), poet, wr.
Joëlle Wintrebert (b. 1949, France), science fiction and ch. wr.
Maria Wirtemberska (1768–1864, Poland/France), wr. & philanthropist
Jane Wiseman (c. 1682–1717, England), poet & pw.
Eleanor Witcombe (1923–2018, Australia), screenwriter
Carolinda Witt (b. 1955, Kenya), wr. on yoga
Monique Wittig (1935–2003, France), wr. & feminist
Amy Witting (Joan Austral Fraser, 1918–2001, Australia), nv. & poet
Maria Petronella Woesthoven (1760–1830, Netherlands), poet
Gabriele Wohmann (1932–2015, Germany), fiction wr.
Maia Wojciechowska (1927–2002, Poland/United States), ch. & YA wr.
Sabina Wolanski (1927–2011, Australia), autobiographer & Hc. survivor
Gunilla Wolde (1939–2015, Sweden), ch. wr. & caricaturist
Cendrine Wolf (b. 1969, France), ch. wr.
Christa Wolf (1929–2011, Germany), nv., critic & es.
Ema Wolf (b. 1948, Argentina), wr. & col.
Leslie Wolfe (b. 1967, United States), nv.
Martha Wolfenstein (1869–1906, United States), nv.
Betje Wolff (1738–1804, Netherlands), nv.
Maryse Wolinski (1943–2021, Algeria/France), nv. & screenwriter
Mary Wollstonecraft (1759–1797, England), nv. & feminist
Claire Wolniewicz (b. 1966, France), wr. & col.
Caroline von Wolzogen (1763–1847, Germany), nv. & biographer
Frances Garnet Wolseley, 2nd Viscountess Wolseley (1872–1936, England), garden wr.
Buffalo Bird Woman (1839–1932, United States), wr.
Alison Wong (b. 1960, New Zealand), poet & nv.
Elizabeth Wong (黃錢其濂, b. 1937, China/New Zealand), fiction wr.
Jade Snow Wong (1922–2006, United States), autobiographer & ceramicist
Nellie Wong (b. 1934, Chile/United States), feminist poet
Ellen (Mrs Henry) Wood (1814–1887, England), nv.
Gaby Wood (b. 1971, England), col. & critic
Gwyneth Barber Wood (died 2006, Jamaica), poet
Julia A. Wood (1840–1927, United States), non-f. wr., composer
Molara Wood (b. 1967, Nigeria), wr. & critic
Susan Wood (1836–1880, Australia/New Zealand), poet & es.
Susan Wood (b. 1946, United States), poet
Wendy Wood (1892–1981, England/Scotland), political wr. & artist
Elizabeth Wood-Ellem (1930–2012, Tonga/Australia), historian
Denyse Woods (b. 1958, Ireland), fiction wr.
Jacqueline Woodson (b. 1963, United States), ch. & YA wr.
Caroline M. Clark Woodward (1840–1924, United States), non-f. wr.
Virginia Woolf (1882–1941, England), fiction wr. & es.; Mrs. Dalloway
Angela Woollacott (b. 1955, Australia), historian
Abba Goold Woolson (1838–1921, United States), wr.
Constance Fenimore Woolson (1840–1894, United States), fiction wr.
Chun Woon-young (천운영, b. 1971, Korea), wr.
Sue Wootton (b. 1961, New Zealand), poet & fiction wr.
Anne Eyre Worboys (1920–2007, New Zealand/England), nv.
Dorothy Wordsworth (1771–1855, England), poet & diarist
Pauline Worm (1825–1883, Denmark), wr., poet & feminist
Elizabeth Strong Worthington (1851–1916, United States), wr.
Isabella Letitia Woulfe (1817–1870, Ireland), nv.
Liliane Wouters (1930–2016, Belgium), poet, pw. & es. in French
Maria Carratalà i Van den Wouver (1899–1984, Spain), pw. in Catalan & musician
Maev-Ann Wren (living, Ireland), economist & health wr.
Alexis Wright (b. 1950, Australia), fiction & non-f. wr.
C. D. Wright (1949–2016, United States), poet
Judith Wright (1915–2000, Australia), poet & environmentalist
June Wright (1919–2012, Australia), crime & non-f. wr.
Mary Tappan Wright (1851–1916, United States), fiction wr.
Patricia Wrightson (1921–2010, Australia), ch. wr.
Lady Mary Wroth (1587–1652, England), poet
Wu Chuntao (b. 1963), wr. & journalist
Wu Zao (吳藻, 1799–1862, China), poet
Hella Wuolijoki (1886–1964, Estonia/Finland), prose wr. & politician
Audrey Wurdemann (1911–1960, United States), poet
Mathilde Wurm (1874–1935, Germany/England), politician & activist
Elinor Wylie (1885–1928, United States), poet & nv.
Ida Alexa Ross Wylie (1885–1959, Australia), nv.
Frances Wynne (1863–1893, Ireland), poet
Grace Wynne-Jones (living, Ireland), wr. & radio pw.
Sylvia Wynter (b. 1928, Jamaica), nv., pw. & critic

X

Makhosazana Xaba (b. 1957, South Africa), poet & fiction wr. in English
Xi Xi (西西, 1937–2022, China), nv. & poet
Xia Jia (王瑶, b. 1984, China), science fiction & fantasy wr.
Xiao Hong (蕭紅, 1911–1942, China), wr.
Xie Daoyun (謝道韞, pre-340 – post-399, China), poet & scholar
Xinran (薛欣然, b. 1958, Chile/England), wr. & col.
Bing Xin (謝婉瑩, 1900–1999, China), wr.
Empress Xu (徐皇后, 1362–1407, China), bibliographer & empress consort
Xu Hui (徐惠, 627–650, China), poet
Xu Kun (徐坤, b. 1965), fiction wr.
Lady Xu Mu (許穆夫人, fl. 7th century BC, China), poet
Xu Zihua (徐自华, 1873–1935, China), poet
Halima Xudoyberdiyeva (1947–2018, Uz), poet
Xue Susu (薛素素, c. 1564 – c. 1650, China), poet
Xue Tao (薛濤, 768–831, China), poet
Rao Xueman (饒雪漫, b. 1972, China), fiction wr. & es.

Y

Rama Yade (b. 1976, Senegal), non-f. wr. & politician
Elham Yaghoubian (living, Iran/Persia), nv.
Tetiana Yakovenko (born 1954, Ukraine), poet
Margarita Yakovleva (b. 1981, Ukraine), poet
Balaraba Ramat Yakubu (b. 1959, Nigeria), nv.
Nanpei Yamada (山田南平, b. 1972, Japan), manga creator
Ryoko Yamagishi (山岸凉子, b. 1947, Japan), manga creator
Yamakawa Kikue (山川菊栄, 1890–1980, Japan), es. & activist
Hisaye Yamamoto (1921–2011, United States), fiction wr.
Mika Yamamoto (山本美香, 1967–2012, Japan), col.
Karen Tei Yamashita (b. 1951, United States), nv., pw. & academic
Kazumi Yamashita (山下和美, b. 1959, manga creator
Yamato Hime no Ōkimi (倭姫王, fl. later 7th century, Japan), poet
Yūki Yamato (山戸結希, b. 1989, Japan), screenwriter
Wakako Yamauchi (1924–2018, United States), wr.
Mari Yamazaki (ヤマザキマリ, b. 1967, Japan), manga creator
Hanya Yanagihara (b. 1974, United States), nv. & travel wr.
María Flora Yáñez (1898–1982, Chile), fiction wr.
Yang Gui-ja (양귀자, b. 1955, Korea), nv.
Tiphanie Yanique (b. 1978, United States), fiction wr., poet & es.
Lyubov Yanovska (1861–1933, Russia/Ukraine), fiction wr. & pw.
Yevheniya Yaroshynska (1868–1904, Austria/Austria-Hungary), fiction wr. in Ukrainian
Laura Yasán (1960–2021, Argentina), poet
Chista Yasrebi (b. 1968, Iran/Persia), wr., critic
Rie Yasumi (やすみりえ, b. 1972, Japan), poet
Paula Yates (1959–2000, England), non-f. wr.
Ai Yazawa (矢沢あい, b. 1967, Japan), manga creator
Yana Yazova (1912–1974, Bulgaria), poet & nv.
Rosa Borja de Ycaza (1889–1964, Ecuador), wr., poet & pw.
Year 24 Group (24年組, early 1970s), manga creators
Ann Yearsley (1753–1806, England), poet, nv. & pw.
Sonja Yelich (b. 1965, Croatia/New Zealand), poet
Yeo Ok (여옥, 1st millennium BC, Korea), poet
Tatyana Yesenina (1918–1992, Russia), nv. & mem.
Anna Yevreinova (1844–1919, Russia), feminist & correspondent
Anzia Yezierska (1883–1970, Poland/United States), fiction wr.
Yi Bingheogak (빙허각이씨, fl. c. 1809, Korea), encyclopedist
Yi Geun-hwa (이근화, b. 1976, Korea), poet & educator
Yi Kyoung-ja (이경자, b. 1948, Korea), fiction wr.
Gullu Yologlu (b. 1963, Azerbaijan), non-f. wr. & ethnologist
Mari Yonehara (米原万里, 1950–2006, Japan), fiction & non-f. wr. & es.
Charlotte Mary Yonge (1823–1901, England), nv.
Yoo An-jin (유안진, b. 1941, Korea), poet, es. & educator
Yosano Akiko (与謝野晶子, 1878–1942, Japan), poet
Akimi Yoshida (吉田秋生, b. 1956, Japan), manga creator
Tomoko Yoshida (吉田知子, b. 1934, Manchuria/Japan), wr.
Banana Yoshimoto (吉本ばなな, b. 1964, Japan), nv.
Nobuko Yoshiya (吉屋信子, 1896–1973, Japan), nv.
Wataru Yoshizumi (吉住渉, b. 1963, Japan), manga creator
Ekaterina Petrova Yosifova (1941–2022, Bulgaria), es. & poet
Ella Young (1867–1956, Ireland), poet & mythologist
Kerry Young (b. 1955, Jamaica/England), nv.
Marguerite Young (1908–1995, United States), nv., poet & academic
Yoo An-jin (유안진, b. 1941, Korea), poet, es. & professor
Rose Maud Young (1866–1947, Ireland), scholar
Kang Young-sook (강영숙, b. 1966, Korea), wr.
Marguerite Yourcenar (1903–1987, Belgium/United States), nv. & es. in French
Malala Yousafzai (b. 1997, Pakistan/England), mem. & politician
Yovanna (b. 1940, Greece), poet, nv. & songwriter
Yu Xuanji (魚玄機, 844–869 or 871, China), poet
Yun I-hyeong (윤이형, b. 1976, Korea), fiction wr.
Yuasa Yoshiko (湯浅芳子, 1896–1990, Japan), linguist & translator
Kaori Yuki (由貴香織里, living, Japan), manga creator
Shigeko Yuki (由起しげ子, 1900–1969, Japan), ch. wr.
Sumomo Yumeka (夢花李, living, Japan), manga creator
Yun-I Hyeong (윤이형, b. 1976, Korea), wr.
Mallika Yunis (living, India), nv.
Sim Yunkyung (심윤경, b. 1972, Korea), nv.
Asako Yuzuki (柚木麻子, b. 1981, Japan), fiction wr.

Z

Oksana Zabuzhko (b. 1960, Ukraine), poet, nv. & non-f. wr.
Rachel Zadok (b. 1972, South Africa), nv. in English
Zafer Hanım (fl. 1877, Turkey/Ottoman Empire), nv.
Jessica Zafra (b. 1965, Philippines), es. & col.
Marija Jurić Zagorka (1873–1957, Austria/Austria-Hungary), wr. in Croat
Helen Zahavi (b. 1966, England), wr.
Rosemarie Said Zahlan (1937–2006, Palestine/United States), wr. on Arab affairs
Anna Zahorska (1882–1942, Poland), poet, nv., pw. and Hc. victim
Stefania Zahorska (1890–1961, Poland), nv. & non-f. wr.
Shama Zaidi (b. 1938, India), art critic & screenwriter
Zahida Zaidi (1930–2011, India), poet, pw. & educator
Zaitoon Bano (1938–2021, India/Pakistan), fiction wr.
Lyubov Zakharchenko (1961–2008 Soviet Union/Russia), poet & songwriter
Maria Julia Zaleska (1831–1889, Poland), fiction wr. & es.
Māra Zālīte (b. 1952, Latvia), poet
Dina Zaman (1969, Malaysia), fiction & non-f. wr. & poet
María Zambrano (1904–1991, Spain), es. & philosopher
Daisy Zamora (b. 1950, Nicaragua), poet
Fatma Zohra Zamoum (b. 1967, Algeria), wr., filmmaker & educator
Adela Zamudio (1854–1928, Bolivia), poet, feminist & educator
Giovanna Zangrandi (1910–1988, Italy), nv.
Giselda Zani (1909–1975, Italy), poet, fiction wr. & critic
Maya Zankoul (b. 1986, Saudi Arabia/Lebanon), nv. & cartoonist
Léontine Zanta (1872–1942, France), nv. & philosopher
Celia Correas de Zapata (1935–2022), poet & non-f. wr.
Gabriela Zapolska (1857–1921, Poland), nv., pw. & naturalist
Ayşe Nur Zarakolu (1946–2002, Turkey/Ottoman Empire), political wr.
Carol Zardetto (living, Guatemala), nv. & critic
Sumaira Zareen (1944–1977, Pakistan), fiction wr.
Shaïda Zarumey (b. 1938, Nigeria), sociologist & poet
Zyranna Zateli (b. 1951, Greece), fiction & non-f. wr.
Marya Zaturenska (1902–1982 United States), poet
Sidonia Hedwig Zäunemann (1711–1740, Germany), poet
Iris Zavala (1936–2020, Paraguay), poet, nv. & non-f. wr.
María de Zayas (1590–1661, Spain), feminist wr.
Amina Zaydan (b. 1966, Egypt), fiction wr.
Zaynab Fawwaz (c. 1860–1914, Lebanon/Egypt), nv., pw. & poet
Katarzyna Ewa Zdanowicz-Cyganiak (b. 1979, Poland), poet & social scientist
Jo Zebedee (b. 1971, Northern Ireland), science fiction wr.
Zdenka Žebre (1920–2011, Yugoslavia/Slovenia), nv. & ch. wr.
Fiona Zedde (b. 1976, Jamaica/United States), nv.
Juli Zeh (b. 1974, Germany), nv.
Alki Zei (1925–2020, Greece), nv. & ch. wr.
Susanna Elizabeth Zeidler (1657 – c. 1706, Germany), poet
Sylvia Aguilar Zéleny (b. 1973, Mexico), fiction wr.
Hana Zelinová (1914–2004, Czechoslovakia/Czech Republic/Slovakia), fiction wr. & pw.
Eva Zeller (1923–2022, Germany), poet & nv.
Žemaitė (1845–1921, Lithuania), fiction wr., es. & pw.
Luisa Zeni (1896–1940, Italy), political wr.
Zeng Baosun (曾寶蓀, 1893–1978, China), historian & feminist
Irena Žerjal (b. 1940, Italy/Slovenia), poet and fiction wr.
Wu Zetian (武則天, 624–705, China), poet, es. & Empress Regnant
Zuzka Zguriška (1900–1984, Austria/Austria-Hungary/Czechoslovakia/Czech Republic), nv. & pw. in Slovak
Yulia Zhadovskaya (1824–1883, Russia), poet & nv.
Zhai Yongming (翟永明, b. 1955, China), poet
Zhang Haidi (张海迪, b. 1955, China), wr.
Zhang Jie (張潔, 1937–2022, China), fiction wr.
Zhang Kangkang (张抗抗, b. 1950, China), political wr.
Lijia Zhang (张丽佳, b. 1964, China), wr. & nv.
Zhang Ling (张翎, b. 1957, China), fiction wr.
Zhao Luorui (趙蘿蕤, 1912–1998, China), poet & translator
Zhang Xinxin (張辛欣, b. 1953, China), wr.
Zhang Yaotiao (張窈窕, 9th century, China), poet
Zhang Yueran (张悦然, b. 1982, China), fiction wr.
Empress Zhangsun (長孫皇后, 601–636, China), moralist
Zhao Luanluan (趙鸞鸞, fl. later 14th century, China), poet
Vera Zhelikhovsky (1835–1896, Russia), wr.
Zheng Min (郑敏, 1920–2022, China), scholar & poet
Zheng Yunduan (c. 1327–1336, China), poet
Polina Zherebtsova (b. 1985, Russia), poet & diarist
Yilin Zhong (鍾宜霖, living, China/England), nv., poet & screenplay wr.
Maria Zhukova (1804–1855, Russia), wr.
Zhu Shuzhen (朱淑真, c. 1135–1180, China), poet
Zhuo Wenjun (卓文君, fl. 2nd century BC, China), poet
Valentina Zhuravleva (1933–2004 Russia), science fiction nv.
Iryna Zhylenko (1941–2013, Soviet Union/Ukraine), poet & es.
May Ziadeh (1886–1941, Lebanon/Palestine), poet & es.
Annejet van der Zijl (b. 1962, Netherlands), nv. & biographer
Lydia Zimmermann (b. 1966, Spain), screenwriter & filmmaker
Alice Zimmern (1855–1939, England), wr. & translator
Helen Zimmern (1846–1934, Germany/England), critic
Hedda Zinner (also Elisabeth Frank, 1905–1994, Germany), political wr.
Marketa Zinnerová (b. 1942, Czechoslovakia/Czech Republic), nv., ch. & screenwriter
Lydia Zinovieva-Annibal (1866–1907, Russia), wr.
Elvania Namukwaya Zirimu (1938–1979, Uganda), poet & pw.
Zitkala-Sa, (1876–1938, United States), wr. & editor
Kathinka Zitz-Halein (1801–1877, Germany), poet and fiction wr.
Nina Živančević (b. 1957, Serbia), pw., poet & nv.
Bina Štampe Žmavc (b. 1951, Yugoslavia/Slovenia), poet, pw. & ch. wr.
Narcyza Żmichowska (1818–1876, Poland), nv. & poet
Inga Žolude (b. 1984, Latvia), fiction wr., pw. & translator
Anna Zonová (b. 1962, Czechoslovakia/Czech Republic), fiction wr.
Halide Nusret Zorlutuna (1901–1984, Turkey/Ottoman Empire), poet, fiction wr. & autobiographer
Birgit Zotz (b. 1979, Austria/Austria-Hungary), non-f. wr. & es.
Vera Zouroff (1880–1967, China), poet, nv. & wr.
Katarina Zrinska (c. 1625–1673, Austria/Austria-Hungary), poet in Croat
Pilar de Zubiaurre (1884–1970, Spain), es. & letter wr.
Svetlana Žuchová (b. 1976, Yu/Slovenia), fiction wr.
Berta Zuckerkandl (1864–1945, Austria/Austria-Hungary), critic & non-f. wr.
Zuo Fen (左芬, c. AD 255–300, China), poet
Katka Zupančič (1889–1967, Austria/Austria-Hungary/United States), ch. poet, fiction wr. & pw.
Unica Zürn (1916–1970, Germany), poet & painter
Cvijeta Zuzorić (1552–1648, Dalmatia/Ragusa), poet in Italian & Croat
Rose Zwi (1928–2018, South Africa/Australia), fiction wr.
Fay Zwicky (1933–2017, Australia), poet & academic
Rajzel Żychlińsky (1910–2001, Poland/United States), poet in Yiddish

See also

 Feminist literary criticism
 Feminist science fiction
 Feminist theory
 Gender in science fiction
 List of biographical dictionaries of female writers
 List of early-modern British women novelists
 List of early-modern British women playwrights
 List of early-modern British women poets
 List of female detective/mystery writers
 List of female poets
 List of women cookbook writers
 List of feminist literature
 List of female rhetoricians
 List of women hymn writers
 Norton Anthology of Literature by Women
 Women in science fiction
 Women Writers Project
 Women's writing in English
 Sophie (digital lib)
 Nimat Hamoush

References

External links
A Celebration of Women Writers
SAWNET: The South Asian Women's NETwork Bookshelf
Victorian Women Writers Project
Voices from the Gaps: Women Artists & Writers of Color
The Women wr.s Archive: Early Modern Women Writers Online
SOPHIE: a digital library of works by German-speaking women
REBRA: a list of women writers from Brazil. Biographies in Portuguese, English, & in Spanish

Women and the arts